= List of birds of North America =

The first edition of the Check-list of North American Birds of the American Ornithological Society, published in 1886

The lists of birds in the light blue box below are divided by biological family. The lists are based on The AOS Check-list of North American Birds of the American Ornithological Society and The Clements Checklist of Birds of the World supplemented with checklists from Panama, Greenland, and Bermuda. It includes the birds of Greenland, Canada, the United States (excluding Hawaii), Mexico, Central America, Bermuda, and the West Indies.

== Taxonomy ==
The taxonomic treatment (designation and sequence of orders, families and species) and nomenclature (common and scientific names) used in the accompanying bird lists adheres to the conventions of the AOS's (2019) Check-list of North American Birds, the recognized scientific authority on the taxonomy and nomenclature of North America birds. The AOS's Committee on Classification and Nomenclature, the body responsible for maintaining and updating the Check-list, "strongly and unanimously continues to endorse the biological species concept (BSC), in which species are considered to be genetically cohesive groups of populations that are reproductively isolated from other such groups" (AOS 2019). The Sibley-Ahlquist taxonomy is an alternative phylogenetic arrangement based on DNA-DNA hybridization.

Unless otherwise noted, all species listed below are considered to occur regularly in North America as permanent residents, summer or winter residents or visitors, or migrants. The following codes are used to denote certain categories of species:

- (A) = Accidental occurrence based on one or two (rarely more) records, and unlikely to occur regularly.
- (E) = Extinct; a recent member of the avifauna that no longer exists.
- (Ex) = Extirpated; no longer occurs in area of interest, but other populations still exist elsewhere.
- (I) = Introduced population established solely as result of direct or indirect human intervention; synonymous with non-native and non-indigenous.

Conservation status - IUCN Red List of Threatened Species:

EX - Extinct, EW - Extinct in the Wild
CR - Critically Endangered, EN - Endangered, VU - Vulnerable
NT - Near Threatened, LC - Least Concern
(v. 2019, the data is current as of July 25, 2019

and Endangered Species Act:

E - endangered, T - threatened
XN, XE - experimental non essential or essential population
E(S/A), T(S/A) - endangered or threatened due to similarity of appearance
(including taxa not necessarily found in the USA, the data is current as of March 28, 2014

== Tinamous ==
Order: Tinamiformes Family: Tinamidae

The tinamous are one of the most ancient groups of bird. Although they look similar to other ground-dwelling birds like quail and grouse, they have no close relatives and are classified as a single family, Tinamidae, within their own order, the Tinamiformes. They are related to the ratites (order Struthioniformes), which includes the rheas, emus, and kiwis.

- Highland tinamou, Nothocercus bonapartei LC
- Great tinamou, Tinamus major NT
- Little tinamou, Crypturellus soui LC
- Thicket tinamou, Crypturellus cinnamomeus LC
- Slaty-breasted tinamou, Crypturellus boucardi LC
- Choco tinamou, Crypturellus kerriae VU

== Screamers ==
Order: Anseriformes Family: Anhimidae

The screamers are a small family of birds related to the ducks. They are large, bulky birds, with a small downy head, long legs, and large feet which are only partially webbed. They have large spurs on their wings which are used in fights over mates and in territorial disputes.

- Horned screamer, Anhima cornuta (E?) LC
- Northern screamer, Chauna chavaria (A) NT

== Ducks, geese, and waterfowl ==
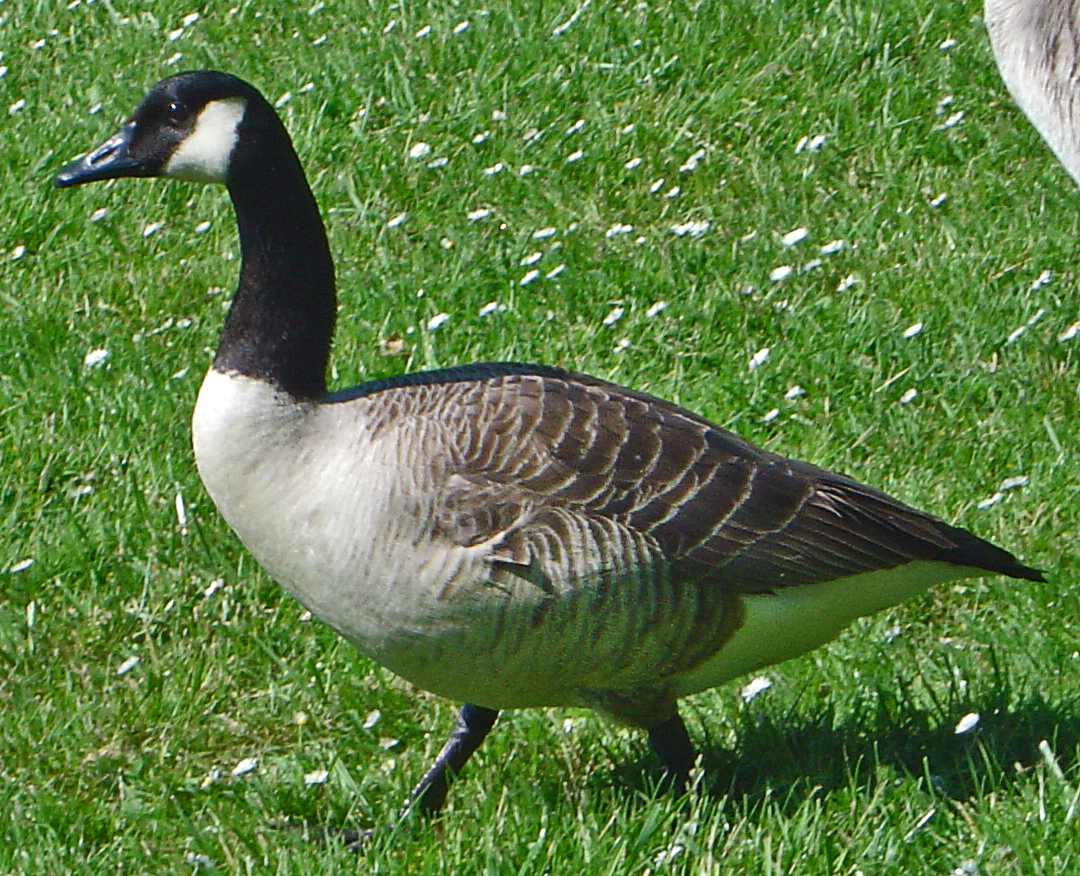
Canada goose

Order: Anseriformes Family: Anatidae

The family Anatidae includes the ducks and most duck-like waterfowl, such as geese and swans. These birds are adapted to an aquatic existence with webbed feet, flattened bills, and feathers that are excellent at shedding water due to special oils.

- American black duck, Anas rubripes LC
- American wigeon, Mareca americana LC
- Baikal teal, Sibirionetta formosa (A) LC
- Barnacle goose, Branta leucopsis (C) LC
- Barrow's goldeneye, Bucephala islandica LC
- Black scoter, Melanitta americana NT
- Black-bellied whistling-duck, Dendrocygna autumnalis LC
- Blue-winged teal, Spatula discors LC
- Brant, Branta bernicla LC
- Bufflehead, Bucephala albeola LC
- Cackling goose, Branta hutchinsii LC
- Canada goose, Branta canadensis LC
- Canvasback, Aythya valisineria LC
- Cinnamon teal, Spatula cyanoptera LC
- Comb duck, Sarkidiornis sylvicola LC
- Common eider, Somateria mollissima NT
- Common goldeneye, Bucephala clangula LC
- Common merganser, Mergus merganser LC
- Common pochard, Aythya ferina (A) VU
- Common scoter, Melanitta nigra (A) LC
- Common shelduck, Tadorna tadorna (A) LC
- Eastern spot-billed duck, Anas zonorhyncha (A) LC
- Egyptian goose, Alopochen aegyptiaca (I) LC
- Emperor goose, Anser canagicus NT
- Eurasian wigeon, Mareca penelope (C) LC
- Falcated duck, Mareca falcata (A) NT
- Fulvous whistling-duck, Dendrocygna bicolor LC
- Gadwall, Mareca strepera LC
- Garganey, Spatula querquedula (A) LC
- Graylag goose, Anser anser (A) LC
- Greater scaup, Aythya marila LC
- Greater white-fronted goose, Anser albifrons LC
- Green-winged teal, Anas crecca LC
- Harlequin duck, Histrionicus histrionicus LC
- Hooded merganser, Lophodytes cucullatus LC
- King eider, Somateria spectabilis LC
- Labrador duck, Camptorhynchus labradorius (E) EX
- Lesser scaup, Aythya affinis LC
- Lesser white-fronted goose, Anser erythropus (A) VU
- Long-tailed duck, Clangula hyemalis VU
- Mallard, Anas platyrhynchos LC
- Masked duck, Nomonyx dominicus LC
- Mexican duck, Anas diazi
- Mottled duck, Anas fulvigula LC
- Muscovy duck, Cairina moschata LC
- Mute swan, Cygnus olor (I) LC
- Northern pintail, Anas acuta LC
- Northern shoveler, Spatula clypeata LC
- Orinoco goose, Neochen jubata (A) NT
- Pink-footed goose, Anser brachyrhynchus (C) LC
- Red-breasted merganser, Mergus serrator LC
- Redhead, Aythya americana LC
- Ring-necked duck, Aythya collaris LC
- Ross's goose, Anser rossii LC
- Ruddy duck, Oxyura jamaicensis LC
- Ruddy shelduck, Tadorna ferruginea (A) LC
- Smew, Mergellus albellus (A) LC
- Snow goose, Anser caerulescens LC
- Southern pochard, Netta erythrophthalma (A) LC
- Spectacled eider, Somateria fischeri NT T
- Stejneger's scoter, Melanitta stejnegeri LC
- Steller's eider, Polysticta stelleri VU T
- Surf scoter, Melanitta perspicillata LC
- Taiga bean-goose, Anser fabalis (A) LC
- Trumpeter swan, Cygnus buccinator LC
- Tufted duck, Aythya fuligula LC
- Tundra bean-goose, Anser serrirostris (A) (A. fabalis: LC)
- Tundra swan, Cygnus columbianus LC
- Velvet scoter, Melanitta fusca (A) VU
- West Indian whistling-duck, Dendrocygna arborea NT
- White-cheeked pintail, Anas bahamensis LC
- White-faced whistling-duck, Dendrocygna viduata LC
- White-winged scoter, Melanitta deglandi LC
- Whooper swan, Cygnus cygnus (A) LC
- Wood duck, Aix sponsa LC

== Guans, chachalacas, and curassows ==
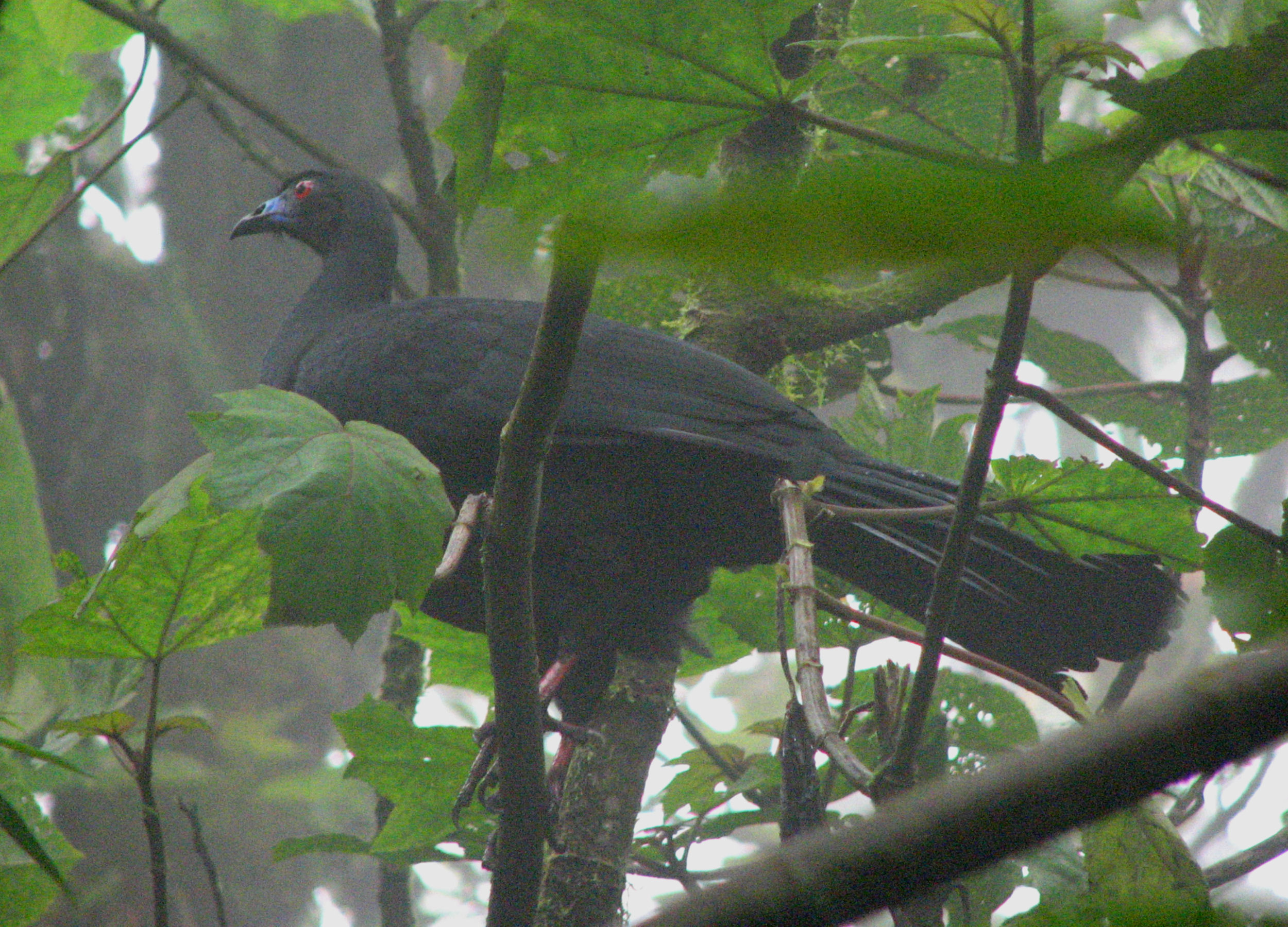
Black guan, Chamaepetes unicolor

Order: Galliformes Family: Cracidae

The chachalacas, guans and curassows are birds in the family Cracidae. These are large birds, similar in general appearance to turkeys. The guans and curassows live in trees, but the smaller chachalacas are found in more open scrubby habitats. They are generally dull-plumaged, but the curassows and some guans have colorful facial ornaments.

- Baudo guan, Penelope ortoni (A) EN
- Black guan, Chamaepetes unicolor LC
- Crested guan, Penelope purpurascens LC
- Gray-headed chachalaca, Ortalis cinereiceps LC
- Great curassow, Crax rubra VU
- Highland guan, Penelopina nigra VU
- Horned guan, Oreophasis derbianus EN E
- Plain chachalaca, Ortalis vetula LC
- Rufous-bellied chachalaca, Ortalis wagleri LC
- Rufous-vented chachalaca, Ortalis ruficauda LC
- Trinidad piping guan, Pipile pipile CR
- West Mexican chachalaca, Ortalis poliocephala LC
- White-bellied chachalaca, Ortalis leucogastra LC

== Guineafowl ==
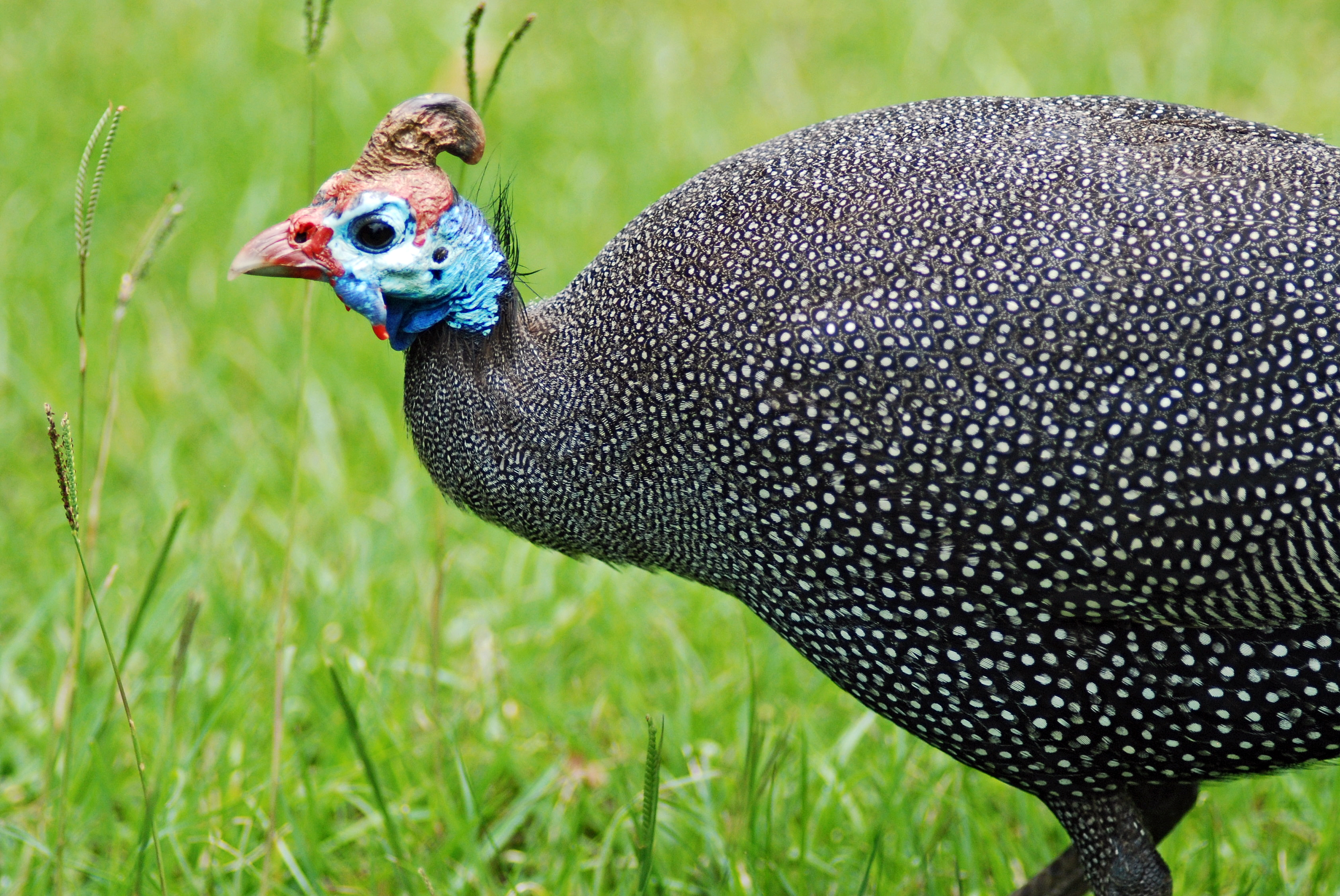
Helmeted guineafowl (Numida meleagris)

Order: Galliformes Family: Numididae

Guineafowl are a group of African, seed-eating, ground-nesting birds that resemble partridges, but with featherless heads and spangled grey plumage.

- Helmeted guineafowl, Numida meleagris (I) LC

== New World quail ==
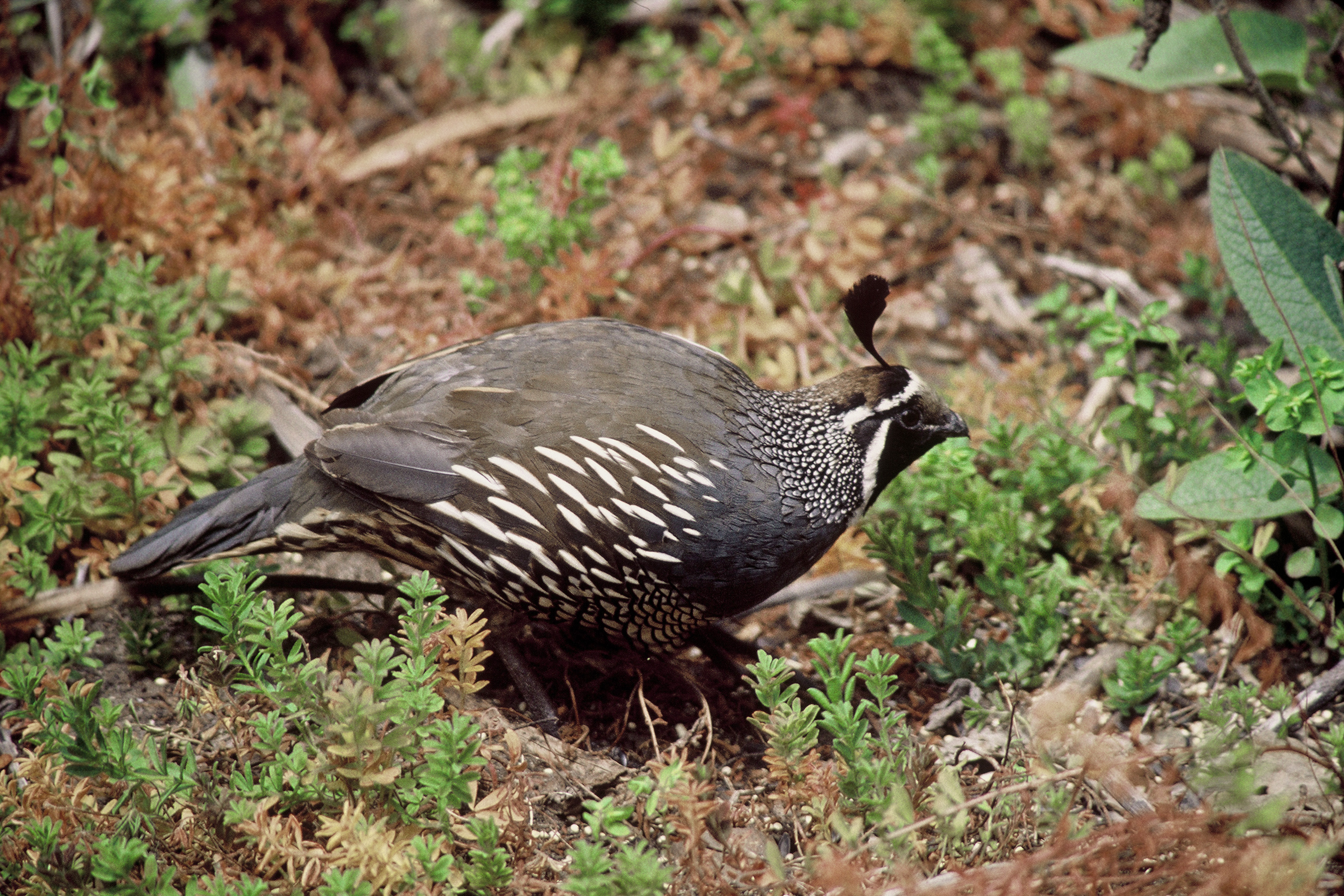
California quail

Order: Galliformes Family: Odontophoridae

The New World quails are small, plump terrestrial birds only distantly related to the quails of the Old World, but named for their similar appearance and habits.

- Banded quail, Philortyx fasciatus LC
- Bearded wood-partridge, Dendrortyx barbatus VU
- Black-breasted wood-quail, Odontophorus leucolaemus LC
- Black-eared wood-quail, Odontophorus melanotis LC
- Black-throated bobwhite, Colinus nigrogularis LC
- Buffy-crowned wood-partridge, Dendrortyx leucophrys LC
- California quail, Callipepla californica LC
- Crested bobwhite, Colinus cristatus LC
- Elegant quail, Callipepla douglasii LC
- Gambel's quail, Callipepla gambelii LC
- Long-tailed wood-partridge, Dendrortyx macroura LC
- Marbled wood-quail, Odontophorus gujanensis NT
- Montezuma quail, Cyrtonyx montezumae LC (Merriam's Montezuma quail C. m. merriami: E)
- Mountain quail, Oreortyx pictus LC
- Northern bobwhite, Colinus virginianus NT (Masked bobwhite C. v. ridgwayi : E)
- Ocellated quail, Cyrtonyx ocellatus VU
- Scaled quail, Callipepla squamata LC
- Singing quail, Dactylortyx thoracicus LC
- Spotted wood-quail, Odontophorus guttatus LC
- Tacarcuna wood-quail, Odontophorus dialeucos VU
- Tawny-faced quail, Rhynchortyx cinctus LC

== Pheasants, grouse, and allies ==
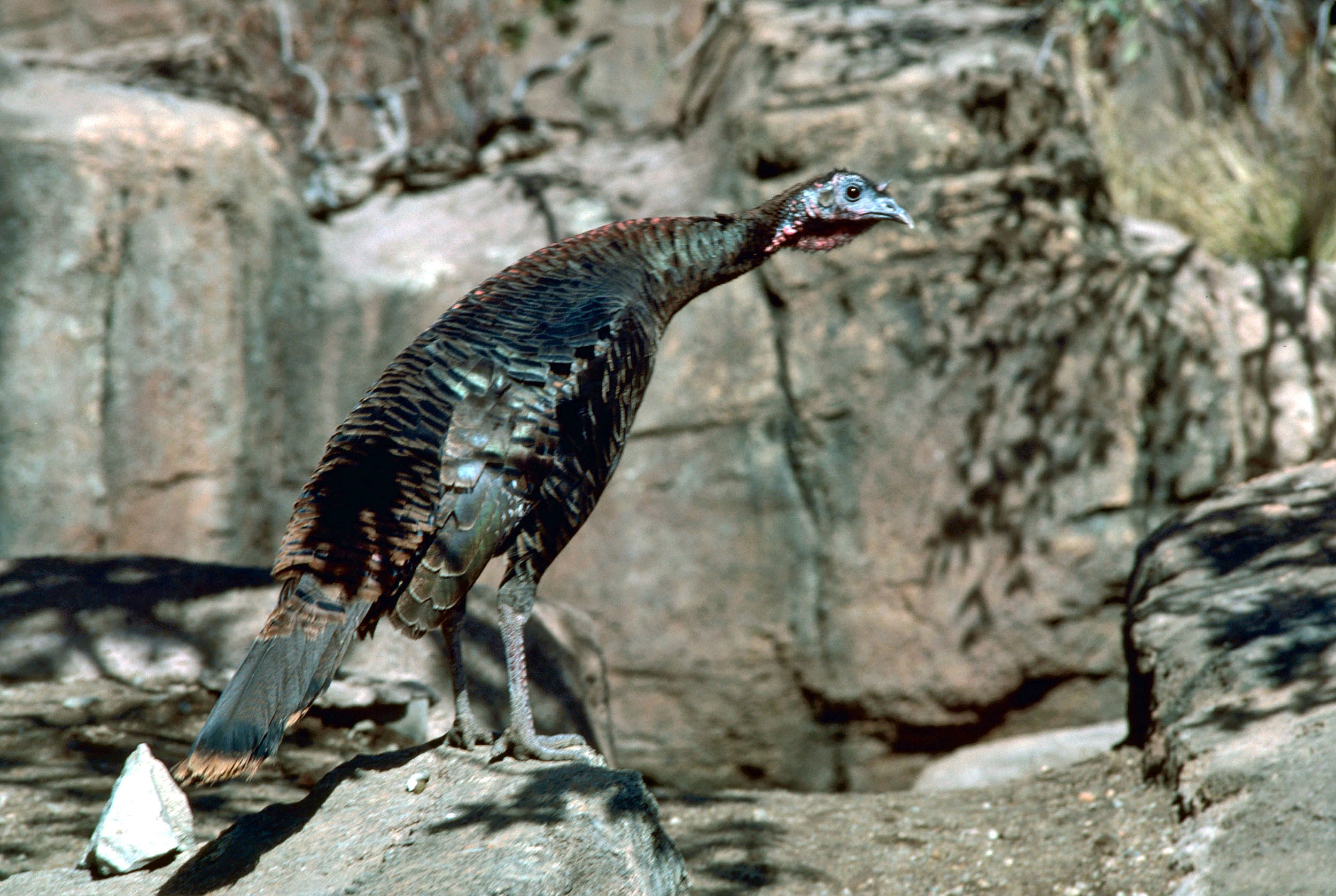
Wild turkey

Order: Galliformes Family: Phasianidae

Phasianidae consists of the pheasants and their allies. These are terrestrial species, variable in size but generally plump with broad relatively short wings. Many species are gamebirds or have been domesticated as a food source for humans.

- Chukar, Alectoris chukar (I) LC
- Dusky grouse, Dendragapus obscurus LC
- Gray partridge, Perdix perdix (I) LC
- Greater prairie-chicken, Tympanuchus cupido NT (Attwater's prairie-chicken T. c. attwateri: E)
- Greater sage-grouse, Centrocercus urophasianus NT
- Gunnison sage-grouse, Centrocercus minimus EN
- Himalayan snowcock, Tetraogallus himalayensis (I) LC
- Indian peafowl, Pavo cristatus (I) LC
- Lesser prairie-chicken, Tympanuchus pallidicinctus VU
- Ocellated turkey, Meleagris ocellata NT
- Red junglefowl, Gallus gallus (I) LC
- Ring-necked pheasant, Phasianus colchicus (I) LC
- Rock ptarmigan, Lagopus muta LC
- Ruffed grouse, Bonasa umbellus LC
- Sharp-tailed grouse, Tympanuchus phasianellus LC
- Sooty grouse, Dendragapus fuliginosus LC
- Spruce grouse, Canachites canadensis LC
- White-tailed ptarmigan, Lagopus leucura LC
- Wild turkey, Meleagris gallopavo LC
- Willow ptarmigan, Lagopus lagopus LC

== Flamingos ==
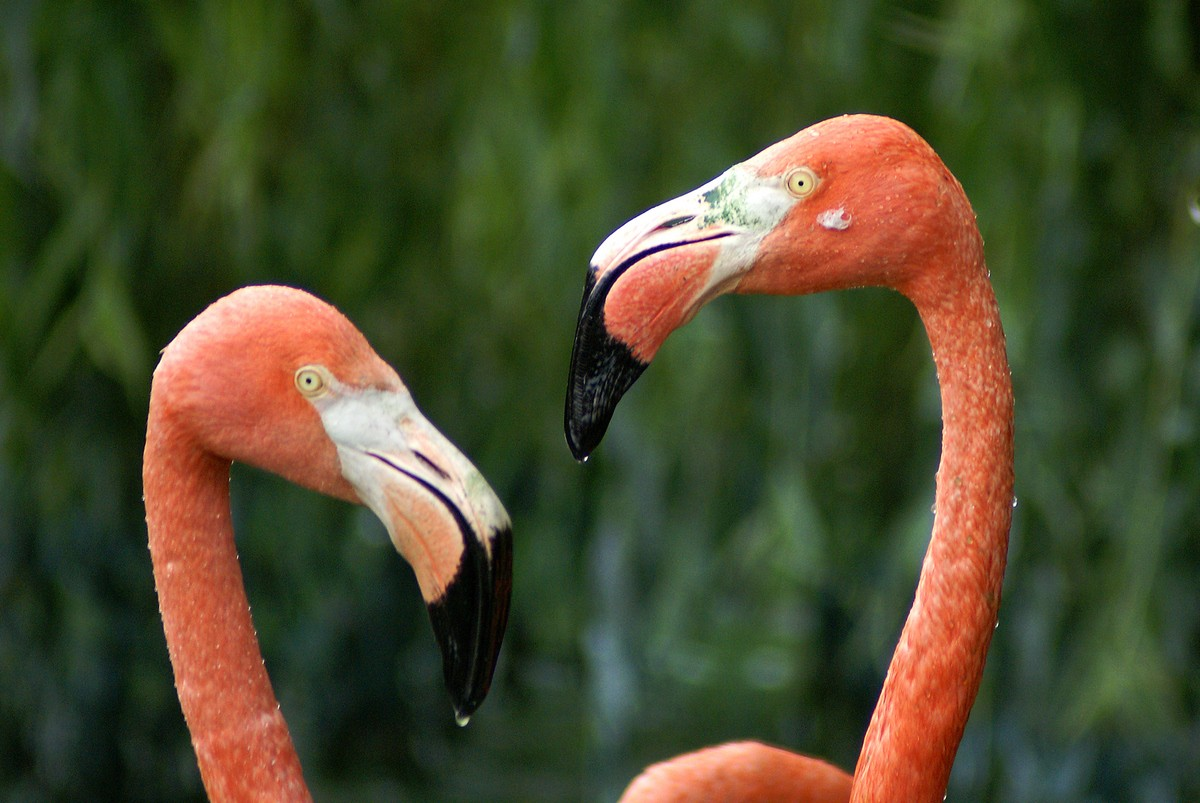
Caribbean flamingo

Order: Phoenicopteriformes Family: Phoenicopteridae

Flamingos (genus Phoenicopterus monotypic in family Phoenicopteridae) are gregarious wading birds, usually 3 to 5 feet (0.9 to 1.5 m) tall, found in both the Western and Eastern Hemispheres. Flamingos filter-feed on shellfish and algae. Their oddly-shaped beaks are specially adapted to separate mud and silt from the food they consume and, uniquely, are used upside-down.

- American flamingo, Phoenicopterus ruber LC

== Grebes ==
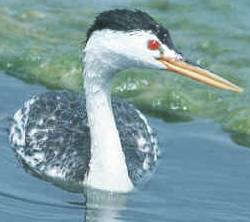
Clark's grebe

Order: Podicipediformes Family: Podicipedidae

Grebes are small to medium-sized diving birds. They breed on fresh water, but often visit the sea when migrating and in winter. They have lobed toes and are excellent swimmers and divers; however, their feet are placed far back on their bodies, making them quite ungainly on land.

- Atitlan grebe, Podilymbus gigas (E) EX E
- Eared grebe, Podiceps nigricollis LC
- Clark's grebe, Aechmophorus clarkii LC
- Horned grebe, Podiceps auritus VU
- Least grebe, Tachybaptus dominicus LC
- Pied-billed grebe, Podilymbus podiceps LC
- Red-necked grebe, Podiceps grisegena LC
- Western grebe, Aechmophorus occidentalis LC

== Pigeons and doves ==
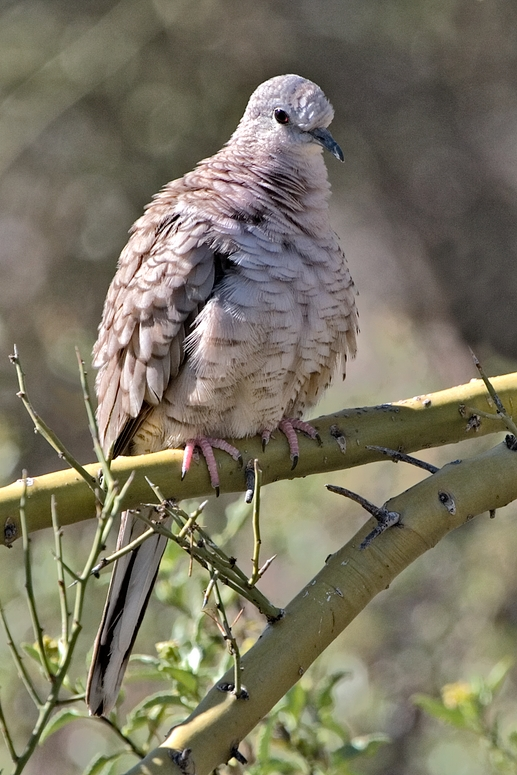
Inca dove

Order: Columbiformes Family: Columbidae

Pigeons and doves are stout-bodied birds with short necks and short slender bills with a fleshy cere.

- African collared-dove, Streptopelia roseogrisea (I) LC
- Band-tailed pigeon, Patagioenas fasciata LC
- Blue ground dove, Claravis pretiosa LC
- Blue-headed quail-dove, Starnoenas cyanocephala EN
- Bridled quail-dove, Geotrygon mystacea LC
- Buff-fronted quail-dove, Zentrygon costaricensis LC
- Caribbean dove, Leptotila jamaicensis LC
- Chiriqui quail-dove, Zentrygon chiriquensis LC
- Common ground dove, Columbina passerina LC
- Common wood pigeon, Columba palumbus (A) LC
- Crested quail-dove, Geotrygon versicolor NT
- Dusky pigeon, Patagioenas goodsoni LC
- Eared dove, Zenaida auriculata LC
- Eurasian collared-dove, Streptopelia decaocto (I) LC
- European turtle-dove, Streptopelia turtur (A) VU
- Gray-chested dove, Leptotila cassinii LC
- Gray-fronted quail-dove, Geotrygon caniceps VU
- Gray-fronted dove, Leptotila rufaxilla (A) LC
- Gray-headed dove, Leptotila plumbeiceps LC
- Grenada dove, Leptotila wellsi CR
- Inca dove, Columbina inca LC
- Key West quail-dove, Geotrygon chrysia LC
- Maroon-chested ground dove, Claravis mondetoura LC
- Mourning dove, Zenaida macroura LC
- Olive-backed quail-dove, Leptotrygon veraguensis LC
- Oriental turtle-dove, Streptopelia orientalis (A) LC
- Pale-vented pigeon, Patagioenas cayennensis LC
- Passenger pigeon, Ectopistes migratorius (E) EX
- Plain pigeon, Patagioenas inornata NT
- Plain-breasted ground dove, Columbina minuta LC
- Plumbeous pigeon, Patagioenas plumbea LC
- Purplish-backed quail-dove, Zentrygon lawrencii LC
- Red-billed pigeon, Patagioenas flavirostris LC
- Ring-tailed pigeon, Patagioenas caribaea VU
- Rock pigeon, Columba livia (I) LC
- Ruddy ground dove, Columbina talpacoti LC
- Ruddy pigeon, Patagioenas subvinacea VU
- Ruddy quail-dove, Geotrygon montana LC
- Russet-crowned quail-dove, Zentrygon goldmani NT
- Scaled pigeon, Patagioenas speciosa LC
- Scaly-naped pigeon, Patagioenas squamosa LC
- Short-billed pigeon, Patagioenas nigrirostris LC
- Socorro dove, Zenaida graysoni EW
- Spotted dove, Streptopelia chinensis (I) LC
- Tuxtla quail-dove, Zentrygon carrikeri EN
- Violaceous quail-dove, Geotrygon violacea LC
- White-crowned pigeon, Patagioenas leucocephala NT
- White-faced quail-dove, Zentrygon albifacies LC
- White-fronted quail-dove, Geotrygon leucometopia EN
- White-tipped dove, Leptotila verreauxi LC
- White-winged dove, Zenaida asiatica LC
- Zenaida dove, Zenaida aurita LC

== Sandgrouse ==
Order: Pterocliformes Family: Pteroclidae

Sandgrouse have small, pigeon like heads and necks, but sturdy compact bodies. They have long pointed wings and sometimes tails and a fast direct flight. Flocks fly to watering holes at dawn and dusk. Their legs are feathered down to the toes.

- Chestnut-bellied sandgrouse, Pterocles exustus (I) LC

== Cuckoos ==
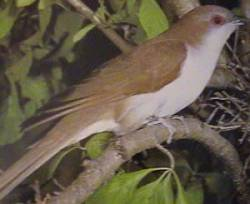
Black-billed cuckoo

Order: Cuculiformes Family: Cuculidae

The family Cuculidae includes cuckoos, roadrunners and anis. These birds are of variable size with slender bodies, long tails and strong legs.

- Bay-breasted cuckoo, Coccyzus rufigularis EN
- Black-billed cuckoo, Coccyzus erythropthalmus LC
- Chestnut-bellied cuckoo, Coccyzus pluvialis LC
- Cocos cuckoo, Coccyzus ferrugineus VU
- Common cuckoo, Cuculus canorus (A) LC
- Dark-billed cuckoo, Coccyzus melacoryphus LC
- Dwarf cuckoo, Coccycua pumila (A) LC
- Gray-capped cuckoo, Coccyzus lansbergi LC
- Great lizard-cuckoo, Coccyzus merlini LC
- Greater ani, Crotophaga major LC
- Greater roadrunner, Geococcyx californianus LC
- Groove-billed ani, Crotophaga sulcirostris LC
- Hispaniolan lizard-cuckoo, Coccyzus longirostris LC
- Jamaican lizard-cuckoo, Coccyzus vetula LC
- Lesser ground-cuckoo, Morococcyx erythropygus LC
- Lesser roadrunner, Geococcyx velox LC
- Little cuckoo, Coccycua minuta LC
- Mangrove cuckoo, Coccyzus minor LC
- Oriental cuckoo, Cuculus optatus (A) LC
- Pearly-breasted cuckoo, Coccyzus euleri (A) LC
- Pheasant cuckoo, Dromococcyx phasianellus LC
- Puerto Rican lizard-cuckoo, Coccyzus vieilloti LC
- Rufous-vented ground-cuckoo, Neomorphus geoffroyi VU (ssp. dulcis: E)
- Smooth-billed ani, Crotophaga ani LC
- Squirrel cuckoo, Piaya cayana LC
- Striped cuckoo, Tapera naevia LC
- Yellow-billed cuckoo, Coccyzus americanus LC

== Nightjars and allies ==
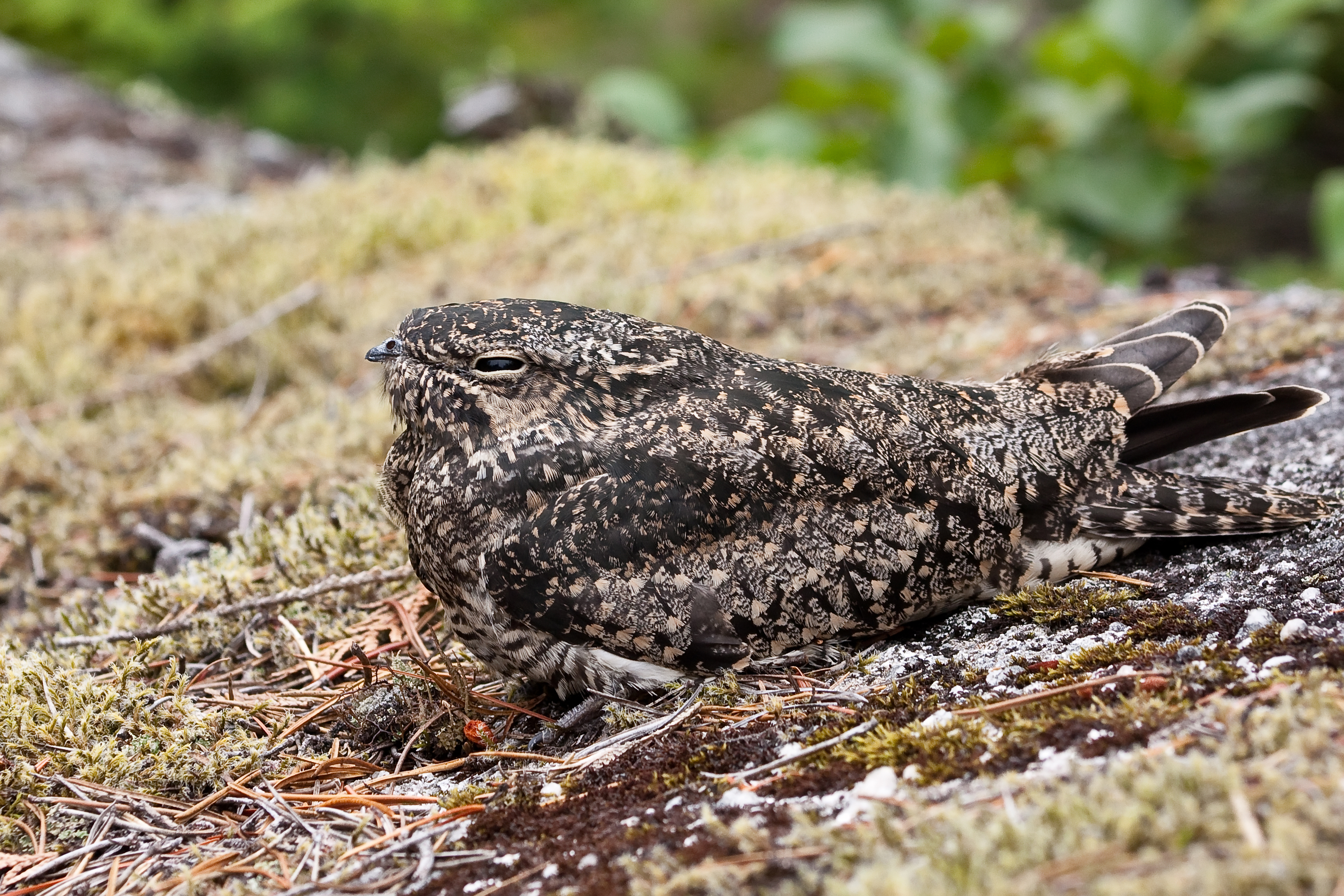
Common nighthawk

Order: Caprimulgiformes Family: Caprimulgidae

Nightjars are medium-sized nocturnal birds that usually nest on the ground. They have long wings, short legs and very short bills. Most have small feet, of little use for walking, and long pointed wings. Their soft plumage is cryptically coloured to resemble bark or leaves.

- Antillean nighthawk, Chordeiles gundlachii LC
- Buff-collared nightjar, Antrostomus ridgwayi LC
- Chuck-will's-widow, Antrostomus carolinensis NT
- Common nighthawk, Chordeiles minor LC
- Common pauraque, Nyctidromus albicollis LC
- Common poorwill, Phalaenoptilus nuttallii LC
- Cuban nightjar, Antrostomus cubanensis LC
- Dusky nightjar, Antrostomus saturatus LC
- Eared poorwill, Nyctiphrynus mcleodii LC
- Eastern whip-poor-will, Antrostomus vociferus NT
- Gray nightjar, Caprimulgus jotaka (A) LC
- Hispaniolan nightjar, Antrostomus ekmani LC
- Jamaican pauraque, Siphonorhis americana (E?) CR
- Least pauraque, Siphonorhis brewsteri NT
- Lesser nighthawk, Chordeiles acutipennis LC
- Mexican whip-poor-will, Antrostomus arizonae LC
- Nacunda nighthawk, Chordeiles nacunda LC
- Ocellated poorwill, Nyctiphrynus ocellatus LC
- Puerto Rican nightjar, Antrostomus noctitherus EN E
- Rufous nightjar, Antrostomus rufus LC
- Short-tailed nighthawk, Lurocalis semitorquatus LC
- Spot-tailed nightjar, Hydropsalis maculicaudus LC
- Tawny-collared nightjar, Antrostomus salvini LC
- White-tailed nightjar, Hydropsalis cayennensis LC
- Yucatan nightjar, Antrostomus badius LC
- Yucatan poorwill, Nyctiphrynus yucatanicus LC

== Oilbird ==
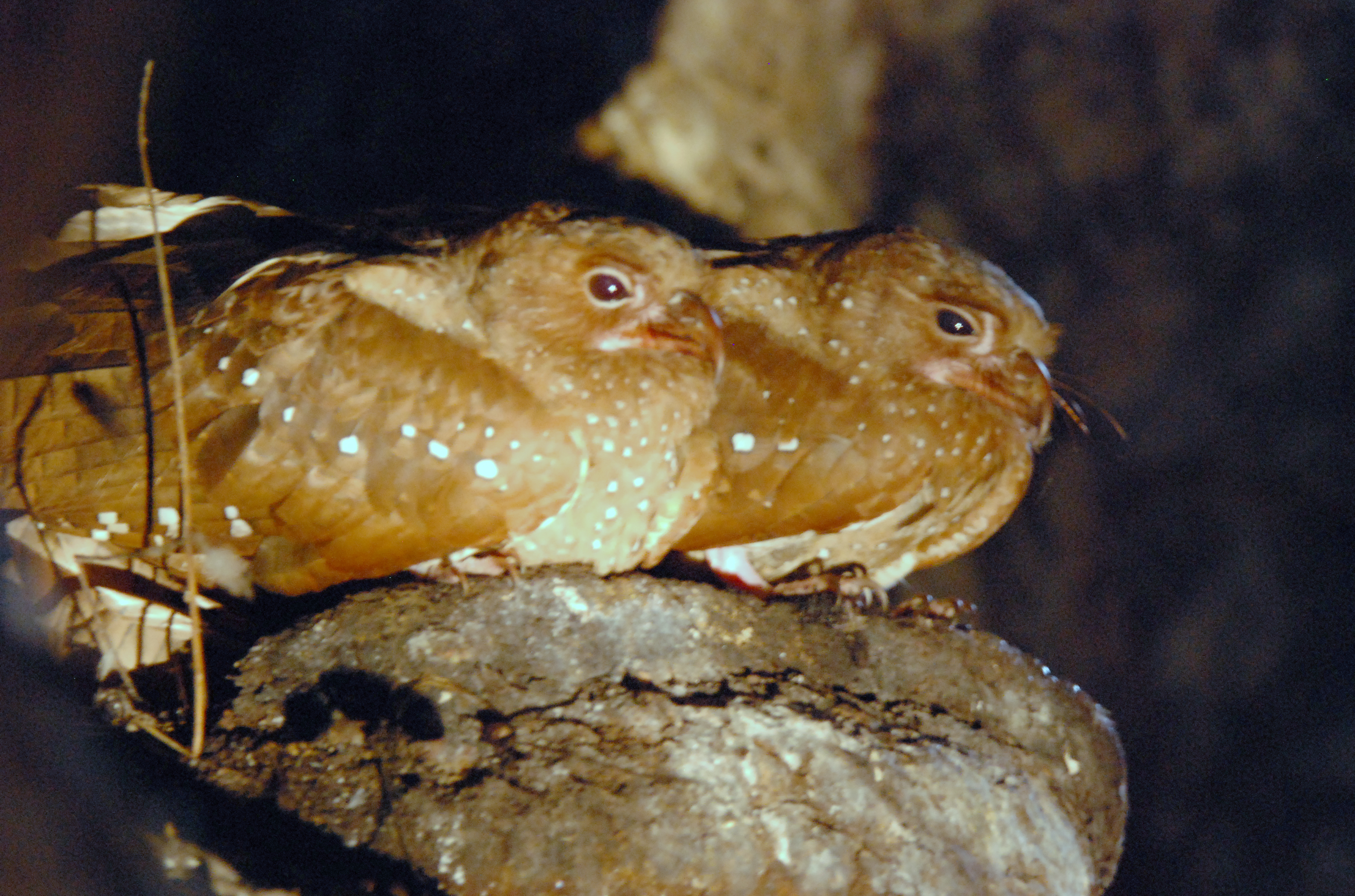
Oilbird

Order: Steatornithiformes Family: Steatornithidae

The oilbird is a slim, long-winged bird related to the nightjars. It is nocturnal and a specialist feeder on the fruit of the oil palm.

- Oilbird, Steatornis caripensis LC

== Potoos ==
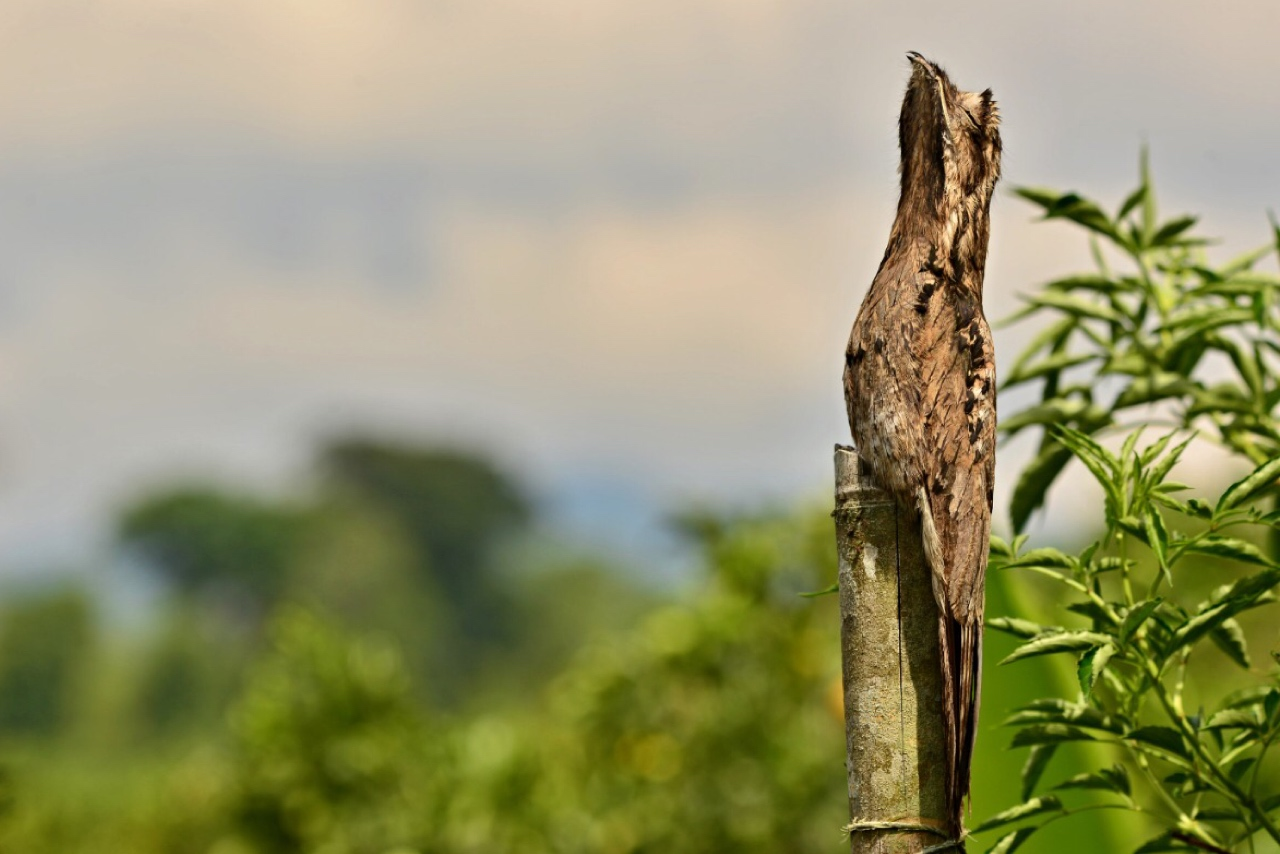
Common potoo

Order: Nyctibiiformes Family: Nyctibiidae

The potoos (sometimes called poor-me-ones) are large birds related to the nightjars and frogmouths. They are nocturnal insectivores which lack the bristles around the mouth found in the true nightjars.

- Common potoo, Nyctibius griseus LC
- Great potoo, Nyctibius grandis LC
- Northern potoo, Nyctibius jamaicensis LC

== Swifts ==
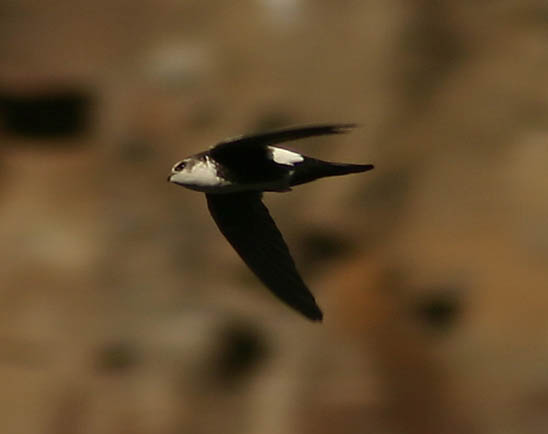
White-throated swift

Order: Apodiformes Family: Apodidae

The swifts are small birds which spend the majority of their lives flying. These birds have very short legs and never settle voluntarily on the ground, perching instead only on vertical surfaces. Many swifts have long swept-back wings which resemble a crescent or boomerang.

- Alpine swift, Apus melba (A) LC
- Black swift, Cypseloides niger VU
- Antillean palm-swift, Tachornis phoenicobia LC
- Band-rumped swift, Chaetura spinicaudus LC
- Chapman's swift, Chaetura chapmani (A) LC
- Chestnut-collared swift, Streptoprocne rutila LC
- Chimney swift, Chaetura pelagica VU
- Common swift, Apus apus (A) LC
- Costa Rican swift, Chaetura fumosa LC
- Fork-tailed palm swift, Tachornis squamata LC
- Gray-rumped swift, Chaetura cinereiventris LC
- Great swallow-tailed swift, Panyptila sanctihieronymi LC
- Lesser Antillean swift, Chaetura martinica LC
- Lesser swallow-tailed swift, Panyptila cayennensis LC
- Little swift, Apus affinis (A) LC
- Fork-tailed swift, Apus pacificus (A) LC
- Short-tailed swift, Chaetura brachyura LC
- Sick's swift, Chaetura meridionalis (A) LC
- Spot-fronted swift, Cypseloides cherriei DD
- Vaux's swift, Chaetura vauxi LC
- White-chinned swift, Cypseloides cryptus LC
- White-collared swift, Streptoprocne zonaris LC
- White-fronted swift, Cypseloides storeri DD
- White-naped swift, Streptoprocne semicollaris LC
- White-throated needletail Hirundapus caudacutus (A) LC
- White-throated swift, Aeronautes saxatalis LC

== Hummingbirds ==
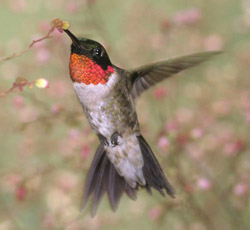
Ruby-throated hummingbird

Order: Apodiformes Family: Trochilidae

Hummingbirds are small birds capable of hovering in mid-air due to the rapid flapping of their wings. They are the only birds that can fly backwards.

- Allen's hummingbird, Selasphorus sasin LC
- Amazilia hummingbird, Amazilis amazilia (A) LC
- Amethyst-throated hummingbird, Lampornis amethystinus LC
- Amethyst woodstar, Calliphlox amethystina (A) LC
- Anna's hummingbird, Calypte anna LC
- Antillean crested hummingbird, Orthorhyncus cristatus LC
- Azure-crowned hummingbird, Saucerottia cyanocephala LC
- Bahama woodstar, Nesophlox evelynae LC
- Band-tailed barbthroat, Threnetes ruckeri LC
- Beautiful hummingbird, Calothorax pulcher LC
- Bee hummingbird, Mellisuga helenae NT
- Berylline hummingbird, Saucerottia beryllina LC
- Black-bellied hummingbird, Eupherusa nigriventris LC
- Black-billed streamertail, Trochilus scitulus LC
- Black-chinned hummingbird, Archilochus alexandri LC
- Black-crested coquette, Lophornis helenae LC
- Black-throated mango, Anthracothorax nigricollis LC
- Blue-capped hummingbird, Eupherusa cyanophrys EN
- Blue-chested hummingbird, Polyerata amabilis LC
- Blue-chinned sapphire, Chlorestes notata LC
- Blue-headed hummingbird, Riccordia bicolor LC
- Blue-tailed hummingbird, Saucerottia cyanura LC
- Blue-throated goldentail, Chlorestes eliciae LC
- Blue-throated hummingbird, Lampornis clemenciae LC
- Blue-vented hummingbird, Saucerottia hoffmanni
- Brace's emerald, Riccordia bracei (E) EX
- Broad-billed hummingbird, Cynanthus latirostris LC
- Broad-tailed hummingbird, Selasphorus platycercus LC
- Bronze-tailed plumeleteer, Chalybura urochrysia LC
- Bronzy hermit, Glaucis aeneus LC
- Brown violetear, Colibri delphinae LC
- Buff-bellied hummingbird, Amazilia yucatanensis LC
- Bumblebee hummingbird, Selasphorus heloisa LC
- Calliope hummingbird, Selasphorus calliope LC
- Canivet's emerald, Cynanthus canivetii LC
- Charming hummingbird, Polyerata decora LC
- Cinnamon hummingbird, Amazilia rutila LC
- Coppery-headed emerald, Microchera cupreiceps LC
- Copper-rumped hummingbird, Saucerottia tobaci LC
- Costa's hummingbird, Calypte costae LC
- Cozumel emerald, Cynanthus forficatus LC
- Crowned woodnymph, Thalurania colombica LC
- Cuban emerald, Riccordia ricordii LC
- Dusky hummingbird, Phaeoptila sordida LC
- Emerald-chinned hummingbird, Abeillia abeillei LC
- Fiery-throated hummingbird, Panterpe insignis LC
- Garden emerald, Chlorostilbon assimilis LC
- Garnet-throated hummingbird, Lamprolaima rhami LC
- Glow-throated hummingbird, Selasphorus ardens EN
- Golden-crowned emerald, Cynanthus auriceps LC
- Green hermit, Phaethornis guy LC
- Green mango, Anthracothorax viridis LC
- Green thorntail, Discosura conversii LC
- Green-breasted mango, Anthracothorax prevostii LC
- Green-breasted mountain-gem, Lampornis sybillae LC
- Green-crowned brilliant, Heliodoxa jacula LC
- Green-fronted hummingbird, Ramosomyia viridifrons LC
- Green-fronted lancebill, Doryfera ludovicae LC
- Greenish puffleg, Haplophaedia aureliae LC
- Green-throated carib, Eulampis holosericeus LC
- Green-throated mango, Anthracothorax viridigula LC
- Green-throated mountain-gem, Lampornis viridipallens LC
- Hispaniolan emerald, Riccordia swainsonii LC
- Hispaniolan mango, Anthracothorax dominicus LC
- Honduran emerald, Amazilia luciae VU
- Humboldt's sapphire, Chrysuronia humboldtii LC
- Inagua woodstar, Nesophlox lyrura LC
- Jamaican mango, Anthracothorax mango LC
- Lesser violetear, Colibri cyanotus
- Little hermit, Phaethornis longuemareus LC
- Long-billed hermit, Phaethornis longirostris LC
- Long-billed starthroat, Heliomaster longirostris LC
- Long-tailed sabrewing, Pampa excellens NT
- Lucifer hummingbird, Calothorax lucifer LC
- Magenta-throated woodstar, Philodice bryantae LC
- Mangrove hummingbird, Amazilia boucardi EN
- Mexican hermit, Phaethornis mexicanus LC
- Mexican sheartail, Doricha eliza NT
- Mexican violetear, Colibri thalassinus LC
- Mexican woodnymph, Eupherusa ridgwayi VU
- Pale-bellied hermit, Phaethornis anthophilus LC
- Pirre hummingbird, Goldmania bella NT
- Plain-capped starthroat, Heliomaster constantii LC
- Puerto Rican emerald, Riccordia maugaeus LC
- Puerto Rican mango, Anthracothorax aurulentus LC
- Purple-crowned fairy, Heliothryx barroti LC
- Purple-throated carib, Eulampis jugularis LC
- Purple-throated mountain-gem, Lampornis calolaemus LC
- Purple-throated woodstar, Philodice mitchellii LC
- Red-billed streamertail, Trochilus polytmus LC
- Rivoli's hummingbird, Eugenes fulgens LC
- Ruby-throated hummingbird, Archilochus colubris LC
- Ruby-topaz hummingbird, Chrysolampis mosquitus LC
- Rufous hummingbird, Selasphorus rufus NT
- Rufous sabrewing, Pampa rufa LC
- Rufous-shafted woodstar, Chaetocercus jourdanii LC
- Rufous-breasted hermit, Glaucis hirsutus LC
- Rufous-crested coquette, Lophornis delattrei LC
- Rufous-tailed hummingbird, Amazilia tzacatl LC
- Sapphire-throated hummingbird, Chrysuronia coeruleogularis LC
- Scaly-breasted hummingbird, Phaeochroa cuvierii LC
- Scintillant hummingbird, Selasphorus scintilla LC
- Short-crested coquette, Lophornis brachylophus CR
- Slender sheartail, Doricha enicura LC
- Snowcap, Microchera albocoronata LC
- Snowy-bellied hummingbird, Saucerottia edward LC
- Sparkling-tailed hummingbird, Tilmatura dupontii LC
- Stripe-tailed hummingbird, Eupherusa eximia LC
- Stripe-throated hermit, Phaethornis striigularis LC
- Talamanca hummingbird, Eugenes spectabilis
- Tooth-billed hummingbird, Androdon aequatorialis LC
- Tufted coquette, Lophornis ornatus LC
- Tres Marias hummingbird, Cynanthus lawrencei NT
- Turquoise-crowned hummingbird, Cynanthus doubledayi LC
- Veraguan mango, Anthracothorax veraguensis LC
- Vervain hummingbird, Mellisuga minima LC
- Violet sabrewing, Campylopterus hemileucurus LC
- Violet-bellied hummingbird, Chlorestes julie LC
- Violet-capped hummingbird, Goldmania violiceps NT
- Violet-crowned hummingbird, Ramosomyia violiceps LC
- Violet-headed hummingbird, Klais guimeti LC
- Volcano hummingbird, Selasphorus flammula LC
- Wedge-tailed sabrewing, Pampa curvipennis LC
- White-bellied emerald, Chlorestes candida LC
- White-bellied mountain-gem, Lampornis hemileucus LC
- White-chested emerald, Chrysuronia brevirostris LC
- White-crested coquette, Lophornis adorabilis LC
- White-eared hummingbird, Basilinna leucotis LC
- White-necked jacobin, Florisuga mellivora LC
- White-tailed emerald, Microchera chionura LC
- White-tailed goldenthroat, Polytmus guainumbi LC
- White-tailed hummingbird, Eupherusa poliocerca VU
- White-tailed sabrewing, Campylopterus ensipennis NT
- White-throated mountain-gem, Lampornis castaneoventris LC
- White-tipped sicklebill, Eutoxeres aquila LC
- White-vented plumeleteer, Chalybura buffonii LC
- Wine-throated hummingbird, Selasphorus ellioti LC
- Xantus's hummingbird, Basilinna xantusii LC

== Rails, gallinules and coots ==
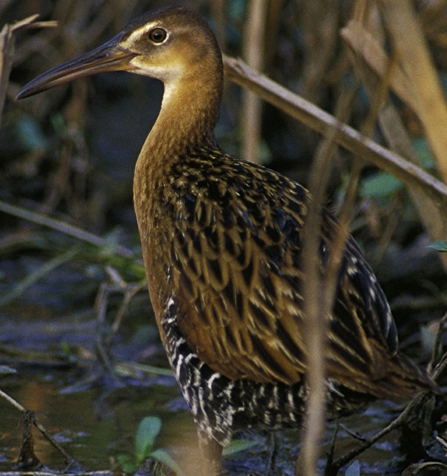
King rail

Order: Gruiformes Family: Rallidae

Rallidae is a large family of small to medium-sized birds which includes the rails, crakes, coots and gallinules. The most typical family members occupy dense vegetation in damp environments near lakes, swamps or rivers. In general they are shy and secretive birds, making them difficult to observe. Most species have strong legs and long toes which are well adapted to soft uneven surfaces. They tend to have short, rounded wings and to be weak fliers.

- American coot, Fulica americana LC
- Purple gallinule, Porphyrio martinicus LC
- Ash-throated crake, Mustelirallus albicollis LC
- Aztec rail, Rallus tenuirostris NT
- Azure gallinule, Porphyrio flavirostris (A) LC
- Black rail, Laterallus jamaicensis EN
- Clapper rail, Rallus crepitans LC
- Colombian crake, Neocrex colombiana DD
- Common gallinule, Gallinula galeata LC
- Common moorhen, Gallinula chloropus (A) LC
- Corn crake, Crex crex (A) LC
- Eurasian coot, Fulica atra (A) LC
- Gray-breasted crake, Laterallus exilis LC
- Gray-cowled wood-rail, Aramides cajaneus LC
- King rail, Rallus elegans NT
- Mangrove rail, Rallus longirostris LC
- Ocellated crake, Micropygia schomburgkii (A) LC
- Paint-billed crake, Neocrex erythrops LC
- Ridgway's rail, Rallus obsoletus NT (Rallus o. obsoletus R. o. obsoletus, R. o. yumanensis and R. o. levipes: E)
- Ruddy crake, Laterallus ruber LC
- Rufous-necked wood-rail, Aramides axillaris LC
- Russet-naped wood-rail, Aramides albiventris LC
- Sora, Porzana carolina LC
- Spotted crake, Porzana porzana (A) LC
- Spotted rail, Pardirallus maculatus LC
- Uniform crake, Amaurolimnas concolor LC
- Virginia rail, Rallus limicola LC
- Purple swamphen, Porphyrio porphyrio (I)
- Western water-rail, Rallus aquaticus (A) LC
- White-throated crake, Laterallus albigularis LC
- Yellow rail, Coturnicops noveboracensis LC
- Yellow-breasted crake, Hapalocrex flaviventer LC
- Zapata rail, Cyanolimnas cerverai CR

== Finfoots ==
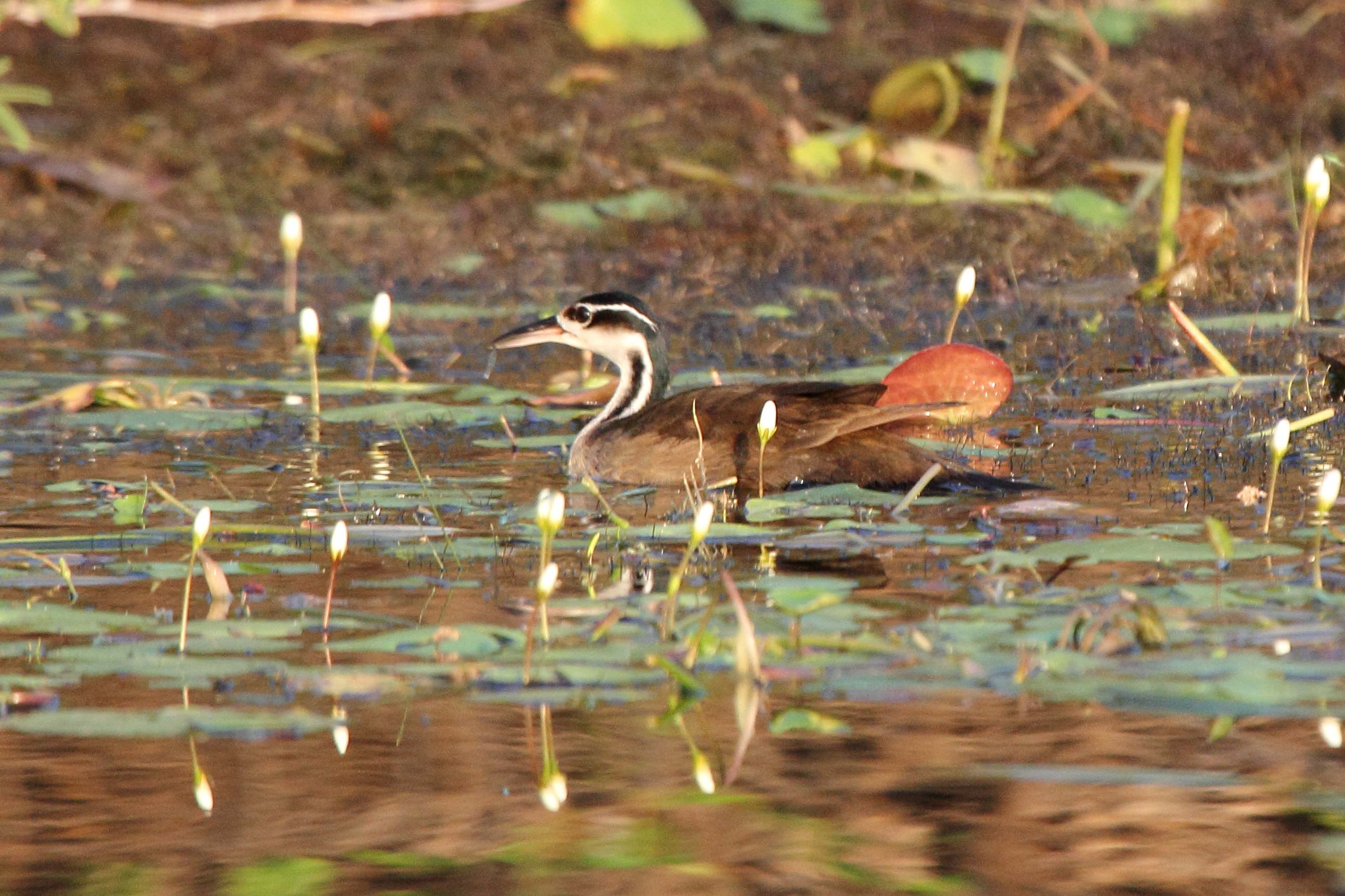
Sungrebe

Order: Gruiformes Family: Heliornithidae

Heliornithidae is a small family of tropical birds with webbed lobes on their feet similar to those of grebes and coots.

- Sungrebe, Heliornis fulica LC

== Limpkin ==
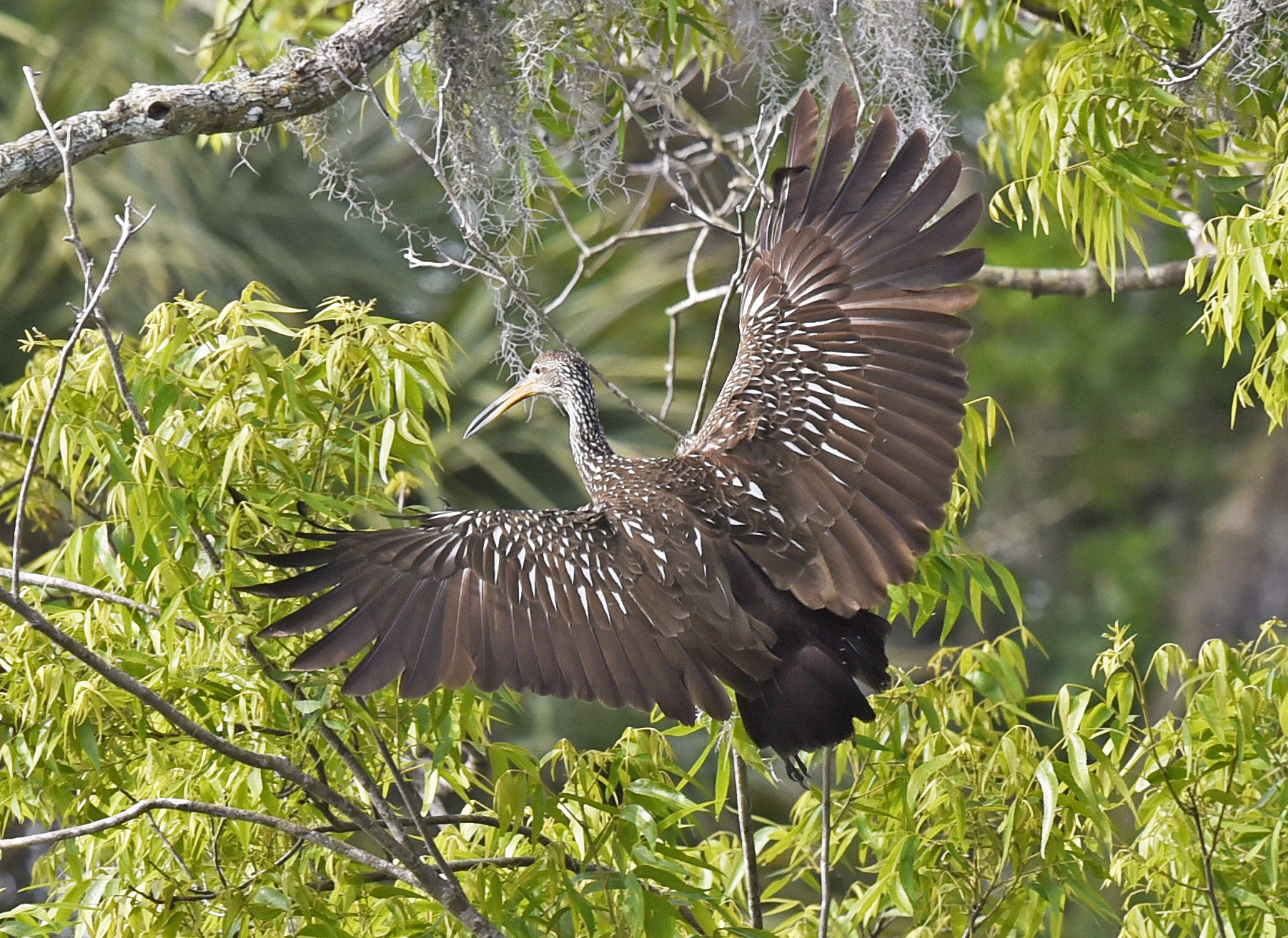
Limpkin

Order: Gruiformes Family: Aramidae

The limpkin is an odd bird that looks like a large rail, but is skeletally closer to the cranes. It is found in marshes with some trees or scrub in the Caribbean, South America and southern Florida.

- Limpkin, Aramus guarauna LC

== Cranes ==
Order: Gruiformes Family: Gruidae

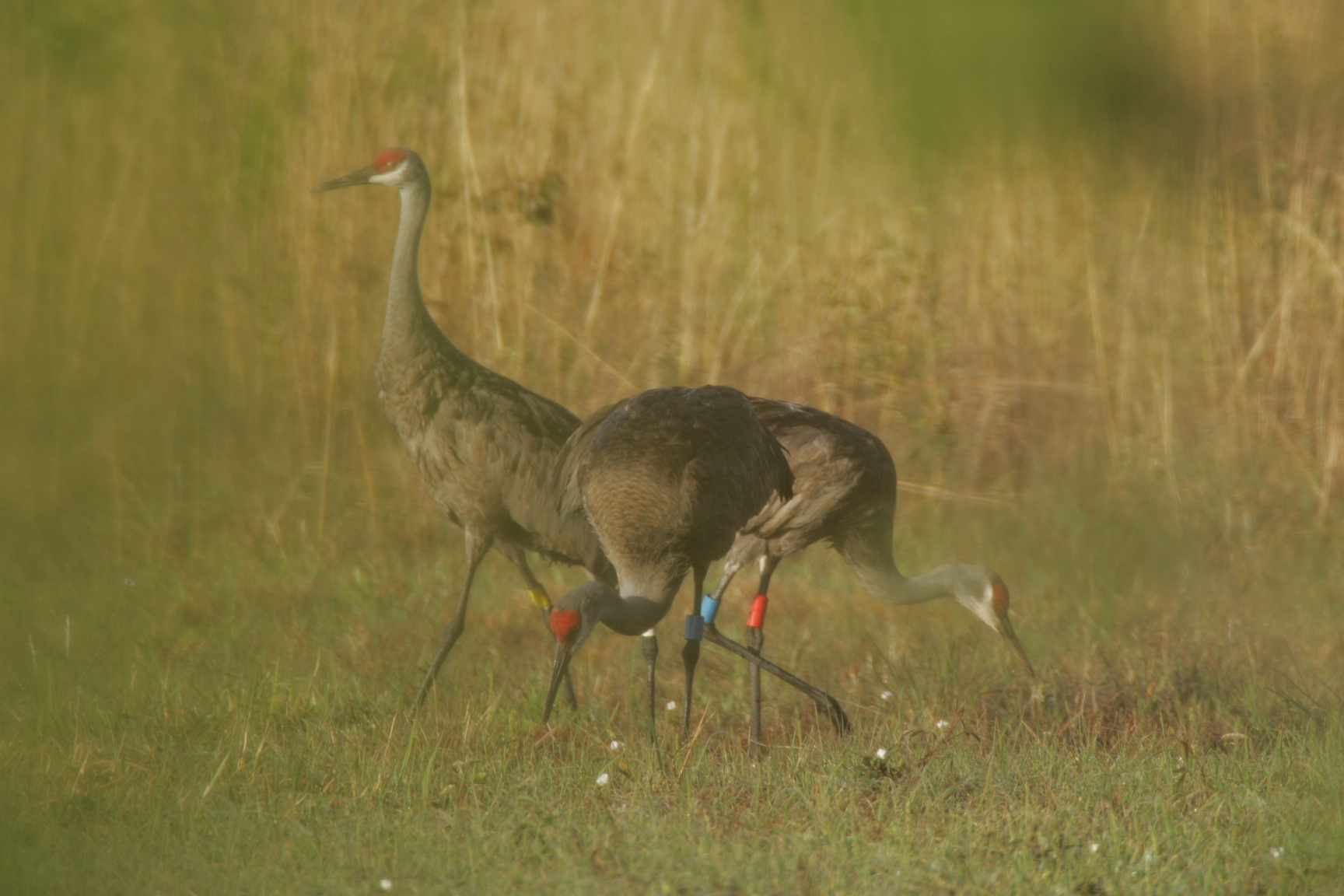
Sandhill crane

Cranes are large, long-legged and long-necked birds. Unlike the similar-looking but unrelated herons, cranes fly with necks outstretched, not pulled back. Most have elaborate and noisy courting displays or "dances".

- Common crane, Grus grus (A) LC
- Hooded crane, Grus monacha (A) VU
- Sandhill crane, Antigone canadensis LC (ssp. nesiotes and pulla: E)
- Whooping crane, Grus americana EN E (and XN)

== Thick-knees ==
Order: Charadriiformes Family: Burhinidae

The thick-knees are a group of waders found worldwide within the tropical zone, with some species also breeding in temperate Europe and Australia. They are medium to large waders with strong black or yellow-black bills, large yellow eyes and cryptic plumage. Despite being classed as waders, most species have a preference for arid or semi-arid habitats.

- Double-striped thick-knee, Burhinus bistriatus LC

== Stilts and avocets ==
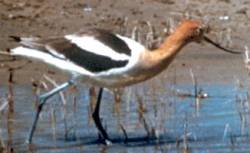
American avocet

Order: Charadriiformes Family: Recurvirostridae

Recurvirostridae is a family of large wading birds, which includes the avocets and stilts. The avocets have long legs and long up-curved bills. The stilts have extremely long legs and long, thin, straight bills.

- American avocet, Recurvirostra americana LC
- Black-winged stilt, Himantopus himantopus (A) LC
- Black-necked stilt, Himantopus mexicanus LC (Hawaiian stilt H. m. knudseni: E)

== Oystercatchers ==
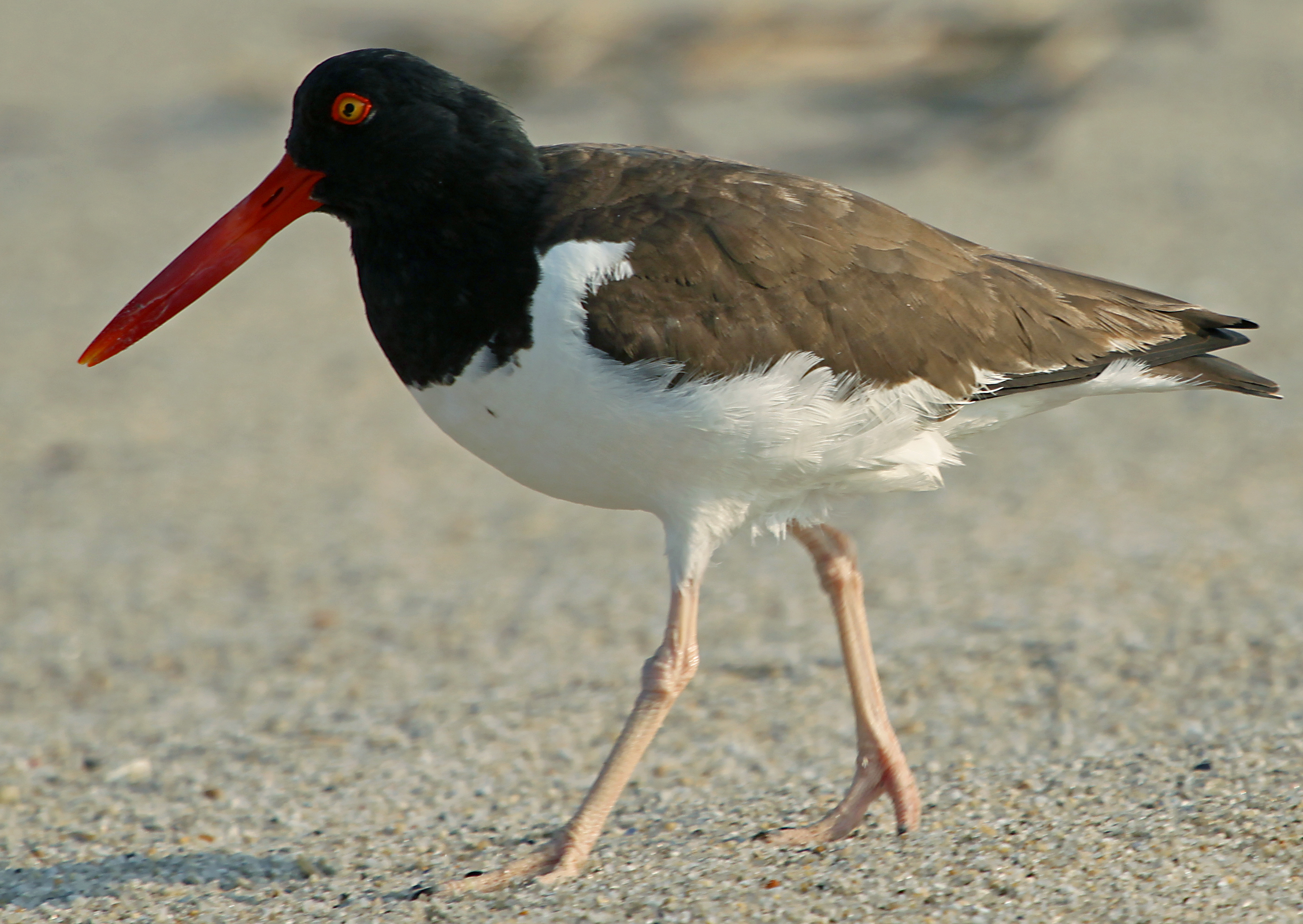
American oystercatcher

Order: Charadriiformes Family: Haematopodidae

The oystercatchers are large, obvious and noisy plover-like birds, with strong bills used for smashing or prising open molluscs.

- American oystercatcher, Haematopus palliatus LC
- Black oystercatcher, Haematopus bachmani LC
- Eurasian oystercatcher, Haematopus ostralegus (A) NT

== Lapwings and plovers ==
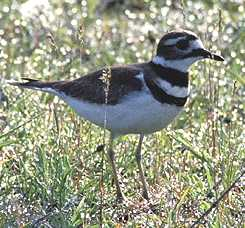
Killdeer

Order: Charadriiformes Family: Charadriidae

The family Charadriidae includes the plovers, dotterels and lapwings. They are small to medium-sized birds with compact bodies, short, thick necks and long, usually pointed, wings. They are found in open country worldwide, mostly in habitats near water.

- American golden-plover, Pluvialis dominica LC
- Black-bellied plover, Pluvialis squatarola LC
- Collared plover, Charadrius collaris LC
- Common ringed plover, Charadrius hiaticula LC
- Eurasian dotterel, Charadrius morinellus (A) LC
- European golden-plover, Pluvialis apricaria (C) LC
- Greater sand plover, Charadrius leschenaultii (A) LC
- Killdeer, Charadrius vociferus LC
- Lesser sand plover, Charadrius mongolus (A) LC
- Little ringed plover, Charadrius dubius (A) LC
- Mountain plover, Charadrius montanus NT
- Northern lapwing, Vanellus vanellus (A) NT
- Oriental plover, Charadrius veredus (A) LC
- Pacific golden-plover, Pluvialis fulva LC
- Piping plover, Charadrius melodus NT T or E
- Semipalmated plover, Charadrius semipalmatus LC
- Snowy plover, Charadrius nivosus NT)
- Southern lapwing, Vanellus chilensis (A) LC
- Wilson's plover, Charadrius wilsonia LC

== Jacanas ==
Order: Charadriiformes Family: Jacanidae

The jacanas are a group of waders found worldwide within the tropical zone. They are identifiable by their huge feet and claws which enable them to walk on floating vegetation in the shallow lakes that are their preferred habitat.

- Northern jacana, Jacana spinosa LC
- Wattled jacana, Jacana jacana LC

== Sandpipers and allies ==
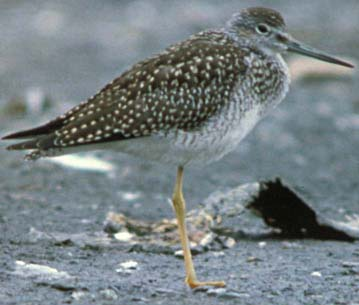
Greater yellowlegs

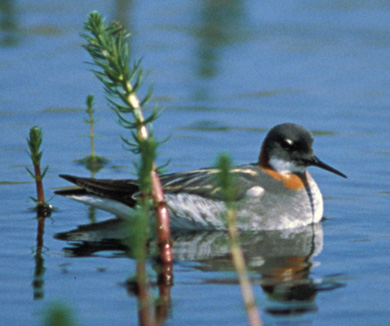
Red-necked phalarope

Order: Charadriiformes Family: Scolopacidae

Scolopacidae is a large diverse family of small to medium-sized shorebirds including the sandpipers, curlews, godwits, shanks, tattlers, woodcocks, snipes, dowitchers and phalaropes. The majority of these species eat small invertebrates picked out of the mud or soil. Different lengths of legs and bills enable multiple species to feed in the same habitat, particularly on the coast, without direct competition for food.

- American woodcock, Scolopax minor LC
- Baird's sandpiper, Calidris bairdii LC
- Bar-tailed godwit, Limosa lapponica NT
- Black turnstone, Arenaria melanocephala LC
- Black-tailed godwit, Limosa limosa (A) NT
- Bristle-thighed curlew, Numenius tahitiensis NT
- Broad-billed sandpiper, Calidris falcinellus (A) LC
- Buff-breasted sandpiper, Calidris subruficollis NT
- Common greenshank, Tringa nebularia (A) LC
- Common redshank, Tringa totanus (A) LC
- Common sandpiper, Actitis hypoleucos (A) LC
- Common snipe, Gallinago gallinago LC
- Curlew sandpiper, Calidris ferruginea NT
- Dunlin, Calidris alpina LC
- Eskimo curlew, Numenius borealis (E?) CR E
- Eurasian curlew, Numenius arquata (A) NT
- Eurasian woodcock, Scolopax rusticola (A) LC
- Far Eastern curlew, Numenius madagascariensis (A) EN
- Great knot, Calidris tenuirostris (A) EN
- Greater yellowlegs, Tringa melanoleuca LC
- Green sandpiper, Tringa ochropus (A) LC
- Gray-tailed tattler, Tringa brevipes (A) NT
- Hudsonian godwit, Limosa haemastica LC
- Whimbrel, Numenius phaeopus LC
- Jack snipe, Lymnocryptes minimus (A) LC
- Least sandpiper, Calidris minutilla LC
- Lesser yellowlegs, Tringa flavipes LC
- Little curlew, Numenius minutus (A) LC
- Little stint, Calidris minuta (A) LC
- Long-billed curlew, Numenius americanus LC
- Long-billed dowitcher, Limnodromus scolopaceus LC
- Long-toed stint, Calidris subminuta (A) LC
- Marbled godwit, Limosa fedoa LC
- Marsh sandpiper, Tringa stagnatilis (A) LC
- Pectoral sandpiper, Calidris melanotos LC
- Pin-tailed snipe, Gallinago stenura (A) LC
- Purple sandpiper, Calidris maritima LC
- Red knot, Calidris canutus NT
- Red phalarope, Phalaropus fulicarius LC
- Red-necked phalarope, Phalaropus lobatus LC
- Red-necked stint, Calidris ruficollis NT
- Rock sandpiper, Calidris ptilocnemis LC
- Ruddy turnstone, Arenaria interpres LC
- Ruff, Calidris pugnax LC
- Sanderling, Calidris alba LC
- Semipalmated sandpiper, Calidris pusilla NT
- Sharp-tailed sandpiper, Calidris acuminata (A) LC
- Short-billed dowitcher, Limnodromus griseus LC
- Slender-billed curlew, Numenius tenuirostris (E?) CR E
- Solitary sandpiper, Tringa solitaria LC
- Solitary snipe, Gallinago solitaria (A) LC
- Spoon-billed sandpiper, Calidris pygmea (A) CR
- Spotted redshank, Tringa erythropus (A) LC
- Spotted sandpiper, Actitis macularius LC
- Stilt sandpiper, Calidris himantopus LC
- Surfbird, Calidris virgata LC
- Temminck's stint, Calidris temminckii (A) LC
- Terek sandpiper, Xenus cinereus (A) LC
- Upland sandpiper, Bartramia longicauda LC
- Wandering tattler, Tringa incana LC
- Western sandpiper, Calidris mauri LC
- White-rumped sandpiper, Calidris fuscicollis LC
- Willet, Tringa semipalmata LC
- Wilson's phalarope, Phalaropus tricolor LC
- Wilson's snipe, Gallinago delicata LC
- Wood sandpiper, Tringa glareola LC

== Pratincoles and coursers ==
Order: Charadriiformes Family: Glareolidae

Pratincoles have short legs, very long pointed wings and long forked tails. Their most unusual feature for birds classed as waders is that they typically hunt their insect prey on the wing like swallows, although they can also feed on the ground. Their short bills are an adaptation to aerial feeding.

- Collared pratincole, Glareola pratincola (A) LC
- Oriental pratincole, Glareola maldivarum (A) LC

== Skuas and jaegers ==
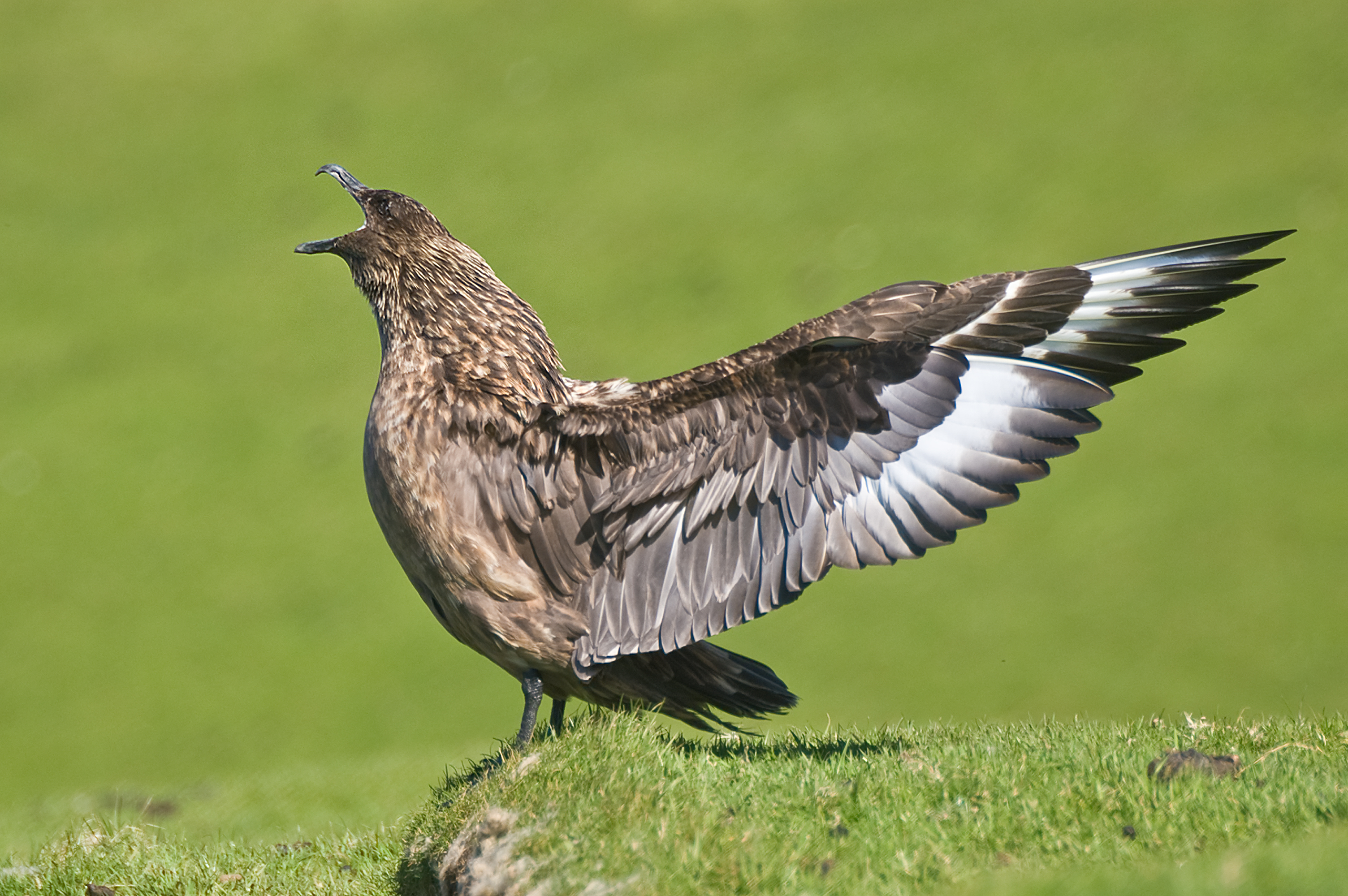
Great skua

Order: Charadriiformes Family: Stercorariidae

Skuas are in general medium to large birds, typically with gray or brown plumage, often with white markings on the wings. They have longish bills with hooked tips and webbed feet with sharp claws. They look like large dark gulls, but have a fleshy cere above the upper mandible. They are strong, acrobatic fliers.

- Great skua, Stercorarius skua LC
- Long-tailed jaeger, Stercorarius longicaudus LC
- Pomarine jaeger, Stercorarius pomarinus LC
- Parasitic jaeger, Stercorarius parasiticus LC
- South polar skua, Stercorarius maccormicki LC

== Auks, murres and puffins ==
Order: Charadriiformes Family: Alcidae

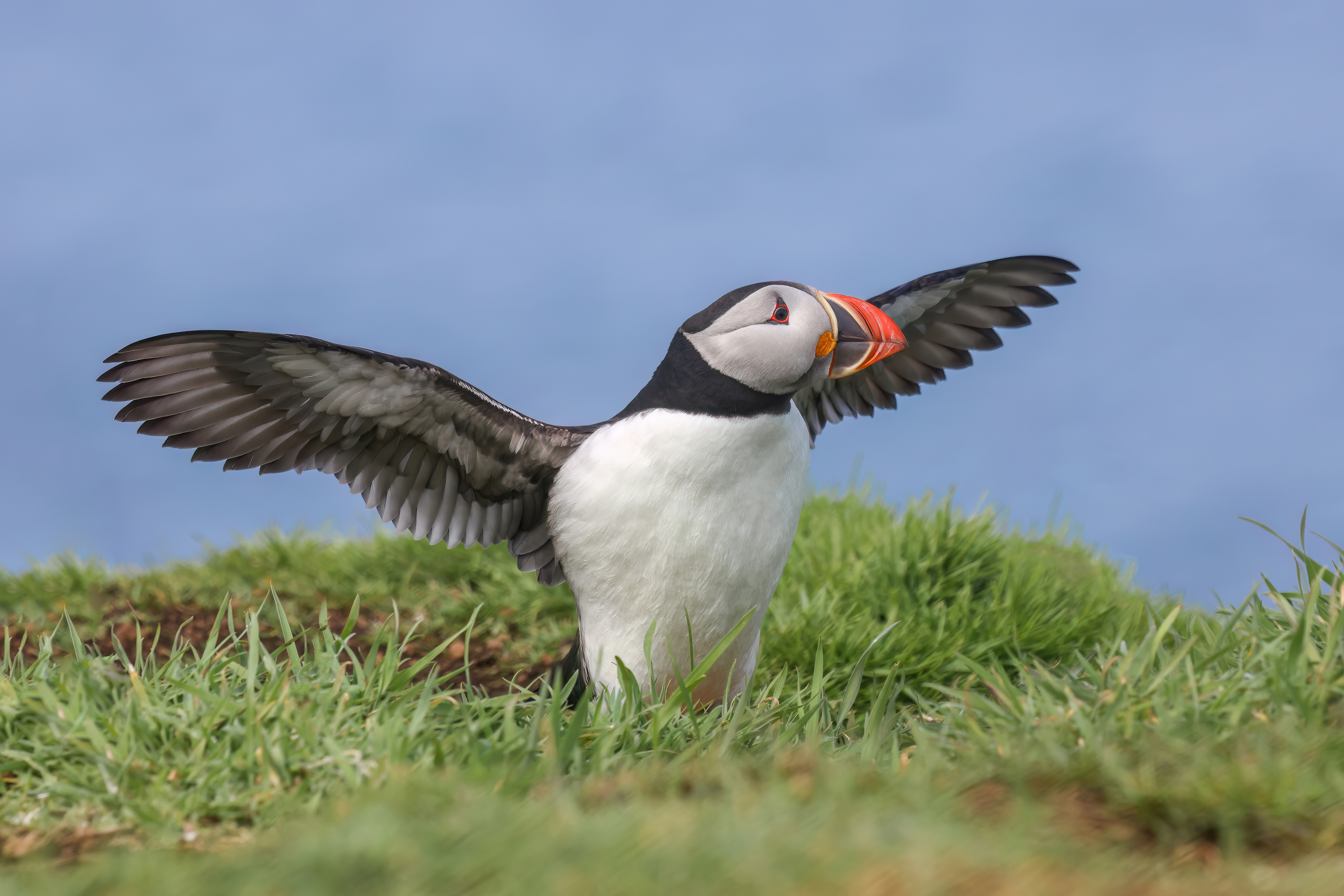
Atlantic puffin

Alcids are superficially similar to penguins due to their black-and-white colors, their upright posture and some of their habits, however they are only distantly related to the penguins and are able to fly. Auks live on the open sea, only deliberately coming ashore to nest.

- Ancient murrelet, Synthliboramphus antiquus LC
- Atlantic puffin, Fratercula arctica VU
- Black guillemot, Cepphus grylle LC
- Cassin's auklet, Ptychoramphus aleuticus NT
- Common murre, Uria aalge LC
- Craveri's murrelet, Synthliboramphus craveri VU
- Crested auklet, Aethia cristatella LC
- Dovekie, Alle alle LC
- Great auk, Pinguinus impennis (E) EX
- Guadalupe murrelet, Synthliboramphus hypoleucus EN
- Horned puffin, Fratercula corniculata LC
- Kittlitz's murrelet, Brachyramphus brevirostris NT
- Least auklet, Aethia pusilla LC
- Long-billed murrelet, Brachyramphus perdix NT
- Marbled murrelet, Brachyramphus marmoratus EN T
- Parakeet auklet, Aethia psittacula LC
- Pigeon guillemot, Cepphus columba LC
- Razorbill, Alca torda NT
- Rhinoceros auklet, Cerorhinca monocerata LC
- Scripps's murrelet, Synthliboramphus scrippsi VU
- Thick-billed murre, Uria lomvia LC
- Tufted puffin, Fratercula cirrhata LC
- Whiskered auklet, Aethia pygmaea LC

== Gulls, terns, and skimmers ==
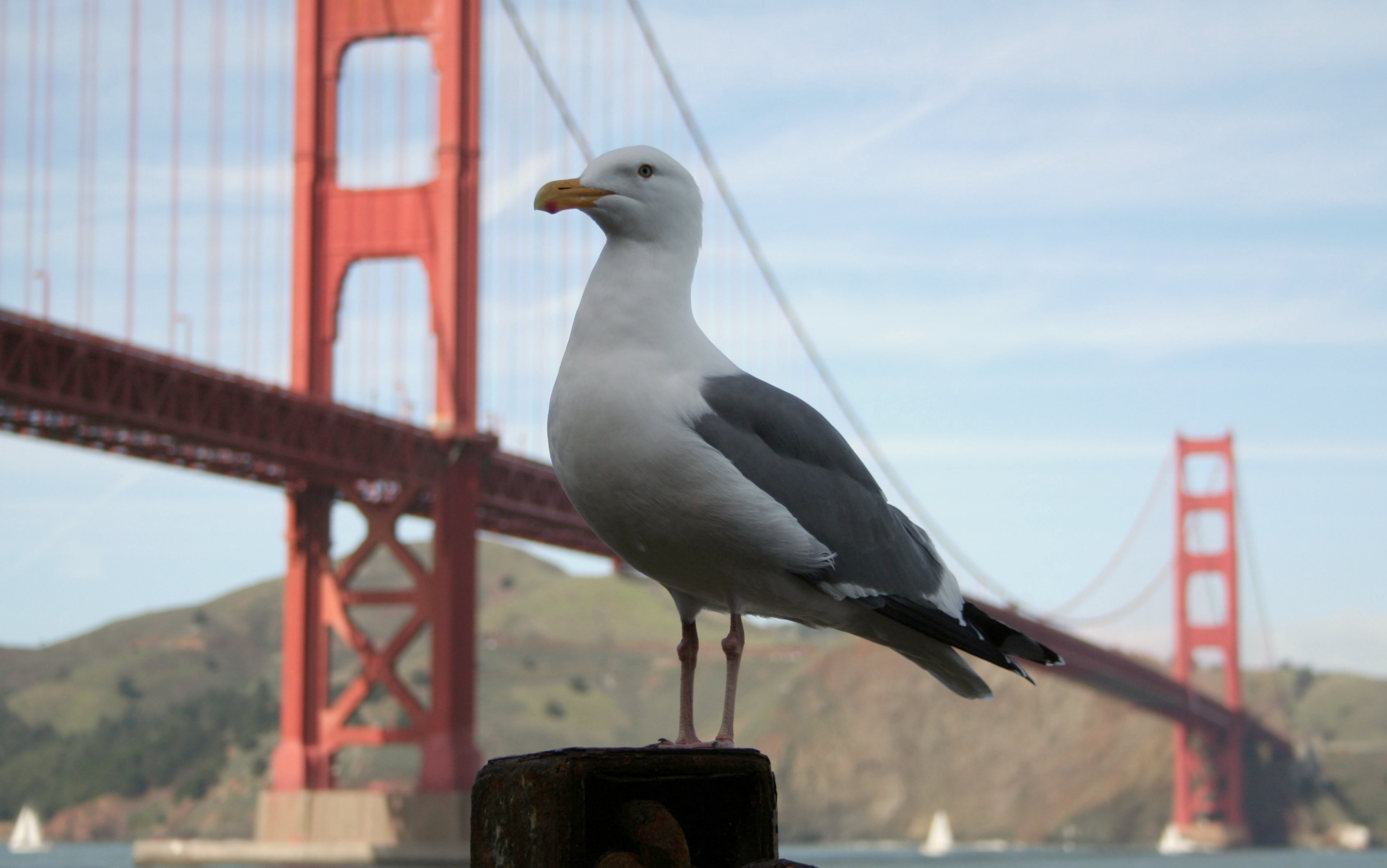
A western gull in front of the Golden Gate Bridge in San Francisco

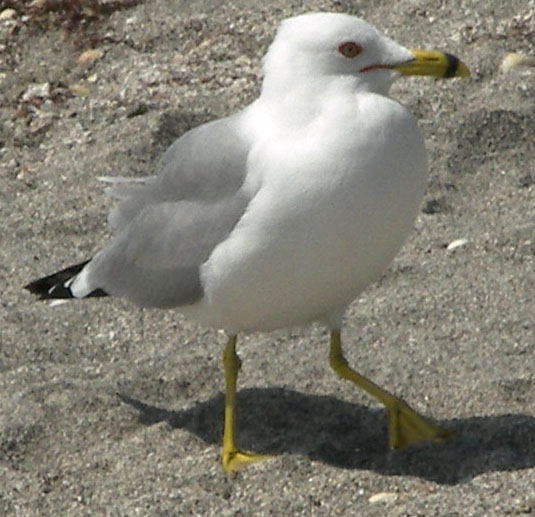
Ring-billed gull

Order: Charadriiformes Family: Laridae

Laridae is a family of medium to large seabirds and includes gulls, terns, kittiwakes and skimmers. Gulls are typically gray or white, often with black markings on the head or wings. They have stout, longish bills and webbed feet. Terns are a group of generally medium to large seabirds typically with grey or white plumage, often with black markings on the head. Most terns hunt fish by diving but some pick insects off the surface of fresh water. Terns are generally long-lived birds, with several species known to live in excess of 30 years. Skimmers are a small family of tropical tern-like birds. They have an elongated lower mandible which they use to feed by flying low over the water surface and skimming the water for small fish.

- Aleutian tern, Onychoprion aleuticus VU
- Herring gull Larus argentatus LC)
- Arctic tern, Sterna paradisaea LC
- Belcher's gull, Larus belcheri (A) LC
- Black noddy, Anous minutus LC
- Black skimmer, Rynchops niger LC
- Black tern, Chlidonias niger LC
- Black-headed gull, Chroicocephalus ridibundus LC
- Black-legged kittiwake, Rissa tridactyla VU
- Black-tailed gull, Larus crassirostris (A) LC
- Bonaparte's gull, Chroicocephalus philadelphia LC
- Bridled tern, Onychoprion anaethetus LC
- Brown noddy, Anous stolidus LC
- California gull, Larus californicus LC
- Caspian tern, Hydroprogne caspia LC
- Common gull, Larus canus LC
- Common tern, Sterna hirundo LC
- Elegant tern, Thalasseus elegans NT
- Forster's tern, Sterna forsteri LC
- Franklin's gull, Leucophaeus pipixcan LC
- Glaucous gull, Larus hyperboreus LC
- Glaucous-winged gull, Larus glaucescens LC
- Gray gull, Leucophaeus modestus (A) LC
- Great black-backed gull, Larus marinus LC
- Gray-hooded gull, Chroicocephalus cirrocephalus (A) LC
- Gull-billed tern, Gelochelidon nilotica LC
- Heermann's gull, Larus heermanni NT
- Iceland gull, Larus glaucoides LC
- Inca tern, Larosterna inca (A) NT
- Ivory gull, Pagophila eburnea NT
- Kelp gull, Larus dominicanus LC
- Large-billed tern, Phaetusa simplex (A) LC
- Laughing gull, Leucophaeus atricilla LC
- Least tern, Sternula antillarum LC E (California least tern S. a. browni: E)
- Lesser black-backed gull, Larus fuscus LC
- Little gull, Hydrocoloeus minutus LC
- Pallas's gull, Ichthyaetus ichthyaetus (A) LC
- Red-legged kittiwake, Rissa brevirostris VU
- Ring-billed gull, Larus delawarensis LC
- Roseate tern, Sterna dougallii LC (ssp. dougallii: E or T
- Ross's gull, Rhodostethia rosea LC
- Royal tern, Thalasseus maximus LC
- Sabine's gull, Xema sabini LC
- Sandwich tern, Thalasseus sandvicensis LC
- Short-billed gull, Larus brachyrhynchus
- Slaty-backed gull, Larus schistisagus LC
- Sooty tern, Onychoprion fuscatus LC
- Swallow-tailed gull, Creagrus furcatus (A) LC
- Western gull, Larus occidentalis LC
- Whiskered tern, Chlidonias hybridus (A) LC
- White tern, Gygis alba LC
- White-winged tern, Chlidonias leucopterus (A) LC
- Yellow-billed tern, Sternula superciliaris LC
- Yellow-footed gull, Larus livens LC
- Yellow-legged gull, Larus cachinnans (A) LC

== Sunbittern ==
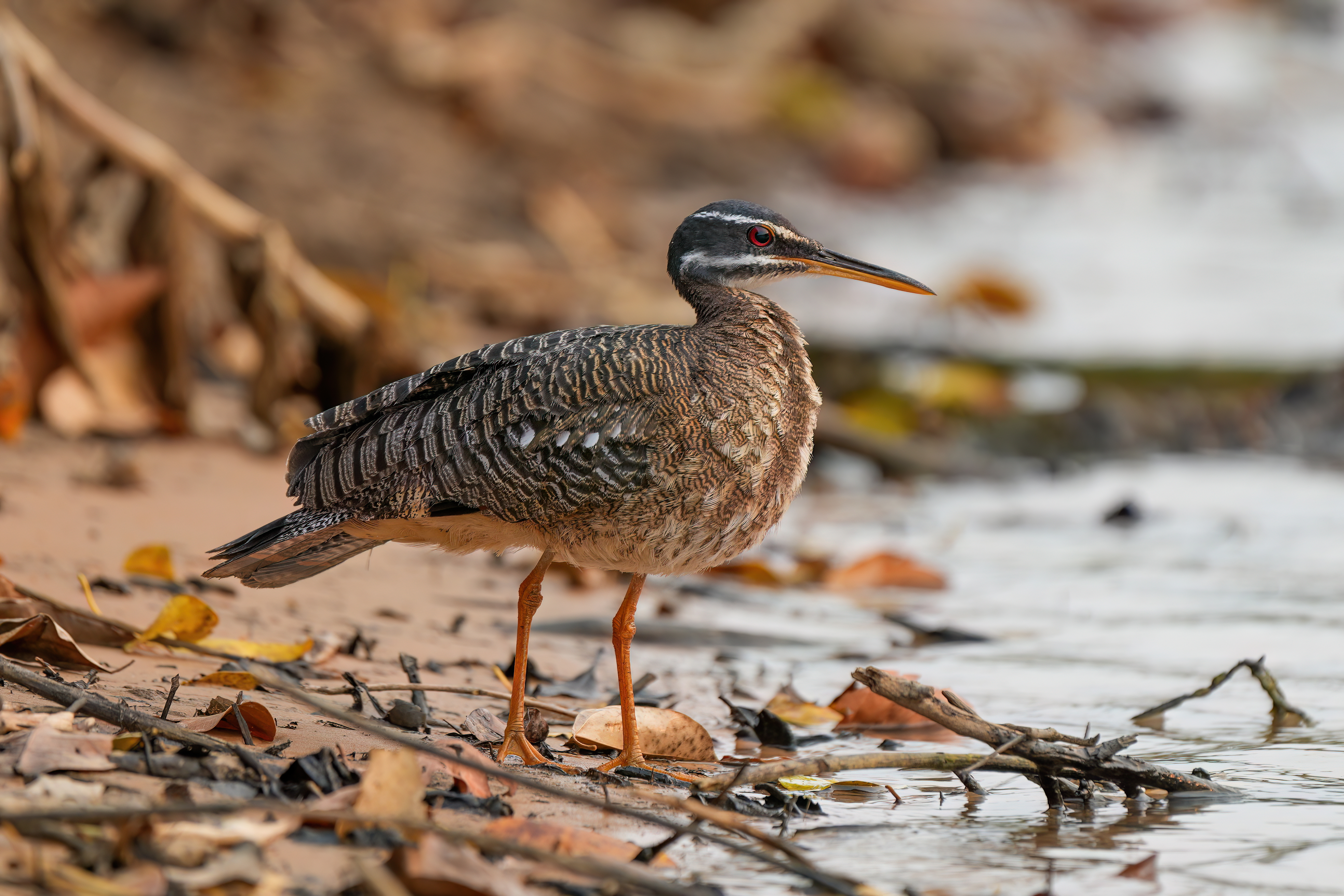
Sungrebe

Order: Eurypygiformes Family: Eurypygidae

The sunbittern is a bittern-like bird of tropical regions of the Americas and the sole member of the family Eurypygidae (sometimes spelled Eurypigidae) and genus Eurypyga.

- Sunbittern, Eurypyga helias LC

== Tropicbirds ==
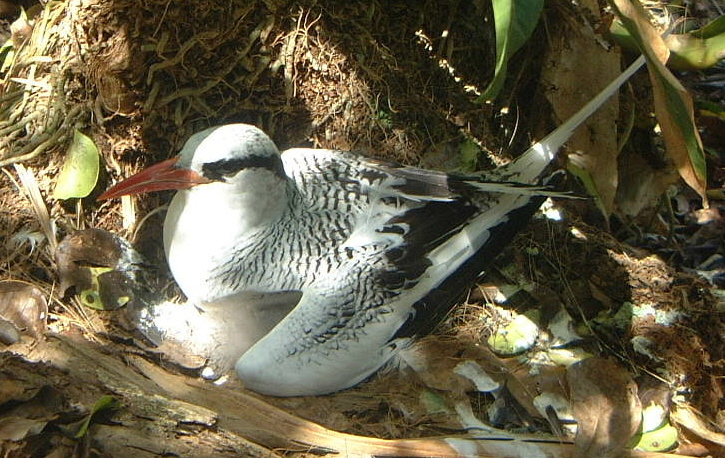
Red-billed tropicbird; a few breed on Swan Cay off the Caribbean coast.

Order: Phaethontiformes Family: Phaethontidae

Tropicbirds are slender white birds of tropical oceans which have exceptionally long central tail feathers. Their heads and long wings have black markings.

- Red-billed tropicbird, Phaethon aethereus LC
- Red-tailed tropicbird, Phaethon rubricauda LC
- White-tailed tropicbird, Phaethon lepturus LC

== Penguins ==
Order: Sphenisciformes Family: Spheniscidae

The penguins are a group of aquatic, flightless birds living almost exclusively in the Southern Hemisphere. Most penguins feed on krill, fish, squid, and other forms of sealife caught while swimming underwater.

- Galapagos penguin, Spheniscus mendiculus (A) EN
- Magellanic penguin, Spheniscus magellanicus (A) LC

== Loons ==
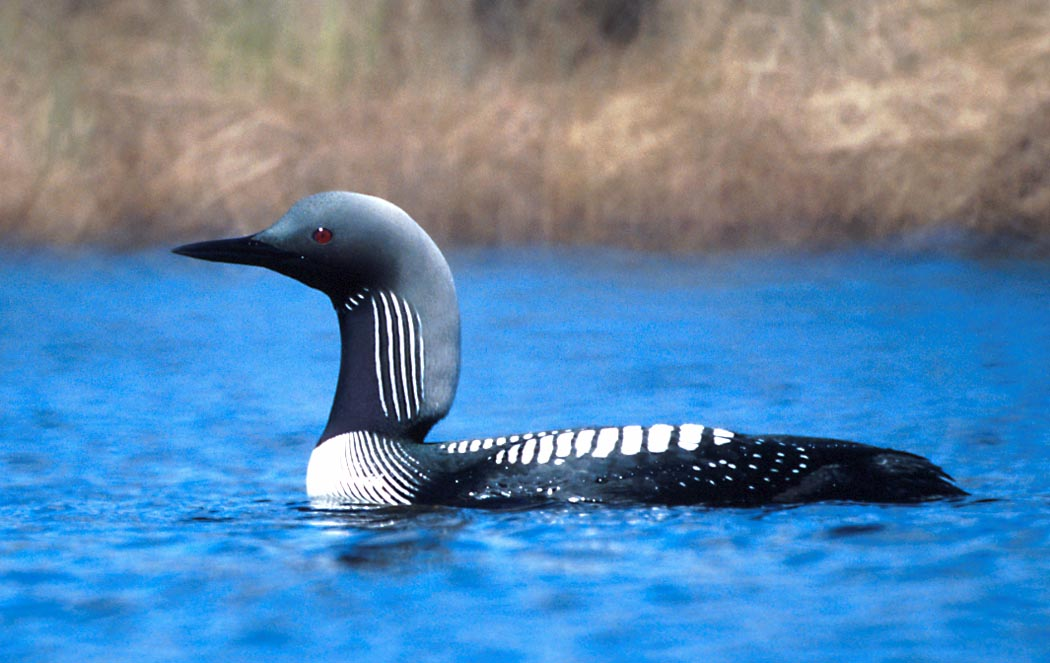
Pacific loon

Order: Gaviiformes Family: Gaviidae

Loons are aquatic birds the size of a large duck, to which they are unrelated. Their plumage is largely gray or black, and they have spear-shaped bills. Loons swim well and fly adequately, but, because their legs are placed towards the rear of the body, are almost helpless on land.

- Arctic loon, Gavia arctica LC
- Common loon, Gavia immer LC
- Pacific loon, Gavia pacifica LC
- Red-throated loon, Gavia stellata LC
- Yellow-billed loon, Gavia adamsii NT

== Albatrosses ==
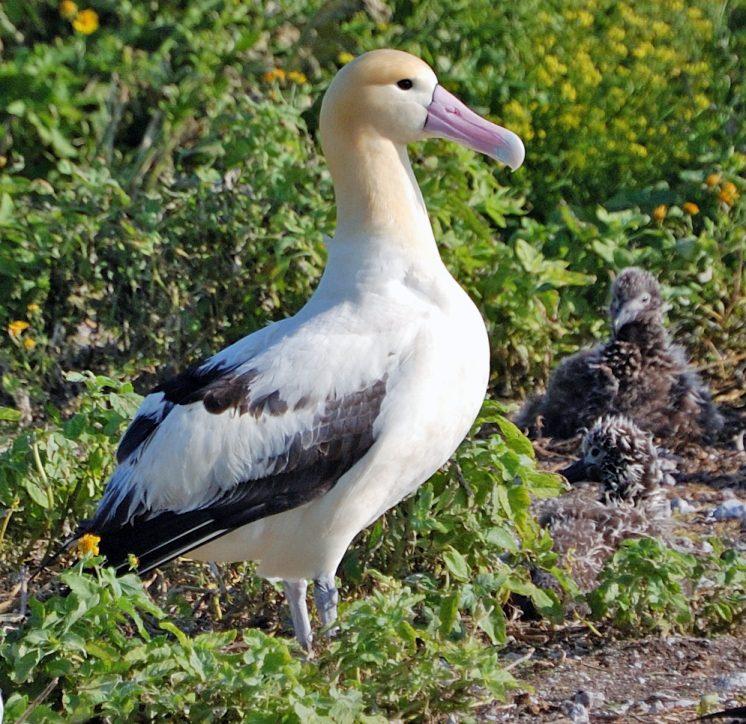
Short-tailed albatross

Order: Procellariiformes Family: Diomedeidae

The albatrosses are amongst the largest of flying birds, and the great albatrosses from the genus Diomedea have the largest wingspans of any extant birds.

- Yellow-nosed albatross, Thalassarche chlororhynchos (C) EN
- Black-browed albatross, Thalassarche melanophris (A) LC
- Black-footed albatross, Phoebastria nigripes NT
- Chatham albatross, Thalassarche eremita (A) VU
- Laysan albatross, Phoebastria immutabilis NT
- Light-mantled albatross, Phoebetria palpebrata (A) NT
- Salvin's albatross, Thalassarche salvini (A) VU
- Short-tailed albatross, Phoebastria albatrus VU E
- White-capped albatross, Thalassarche cauta NT
- Wandering albatross, Diomedea exulans (A) VU
- Waved albatross, Phoebastria irrorata (A) CR

== Southern storm-petrels ==
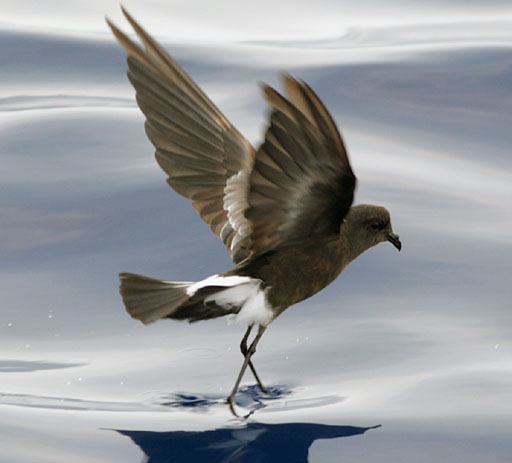
Wilson's storm-petrel

Order: Procellariiformes Family: Oceanitidae

The southern storm-petrels are the smallest seabirds, relatives of the petrels, feeding on planktonic crustaceans and small fish picked from the surface, typically while hovering. The flight is fluttering and sometimes bat-like. Until 2018, this family's three species were included with the other storm-petrels in family Hydrobatidae.

- Black-bellied storm-petrel, Fregetta tropica (A) LC
- White-faced storm-petrel, Pelagodroma marina LC
- Wilson's storm-petrel, Oceanites oceanicus LC

== Northern storm-petrels ==
Order: Procellariiformes Family: Hydrobatidae

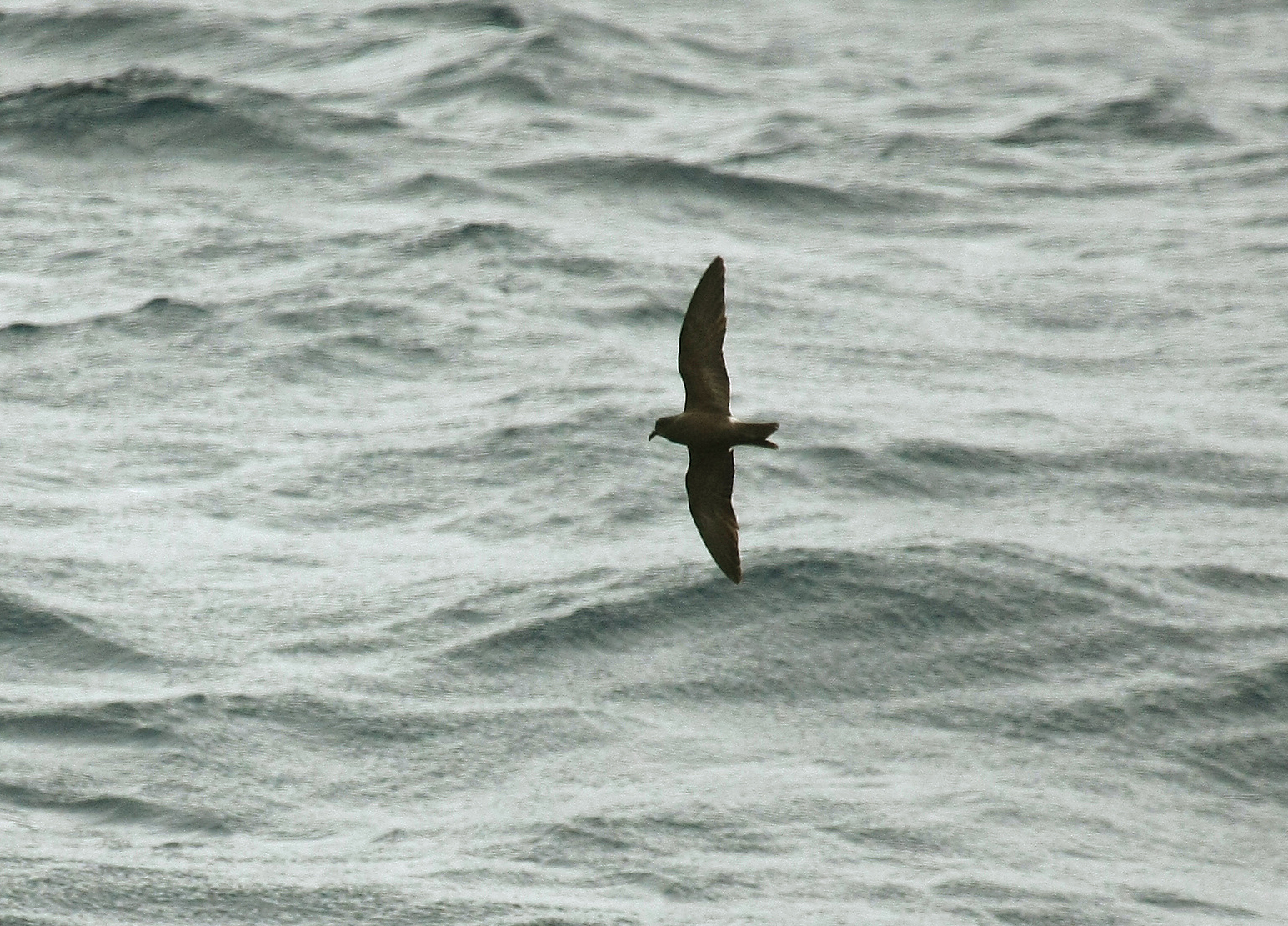
Leach's storm petrel

Though the members of this family are similar in many respects to the southern storm-petrels, including their general appearance and habits, there are enough genetic differences to warrant their placement in a separate family.

- Ainley's storm-petrel, Hydrobates cheimomnestes VU
- Ashy storm-petrel, Hydrobates homochroa EN
- Band-rumped storm-petrel, Hydrobates castro LC
- Black storm-petrel, Hydrobates melania LC
- European storm-petrel, Hydrobates pelagicus (A) LC
- Fork-tailed storm-petrel, Hydrobates furcatus LC
- Guadalupe storm-petrel, Hydrobates macrodactylus (E) CR
- Leach's storm-petrel, Hydrobates leucorhous VU
- Least storm-petrel, Hydrobates microsoma LC
- Markham's storm-petrel, Hydrobates markhami (A) NT
- Ringed storm-petrel, Hydrobates hornbyi (A) NT
- Swinhoe's storm-petrel, Hydrobates monorhis (A) NT
- Townsend's storm-petrel, Hydrobates socorroensis EN
- Tristram's storm-petrel, Hydrobates tristrami (A) LC
- Wedge-rumped storm-petrel, Hydrobates tethys (C) LC

== Shearwaters and petrels ==
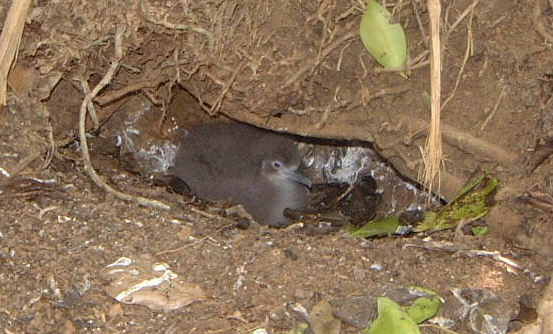
Sargasso shearwater chick, this species breeds on Tiger Cays off the Caribbean coast.

Order: Procellariiformes Family: Procellariidae

The procellariids are the main group of medium-sized "true petrels", characterized by united nostrils with medium septum and a long outer functional primary.

- Sargasso shearwater, Puffinus lherminieri LC
- Barolo shearwater, Puffinus baroli (A)
- Bermuda petrel, Pterodroma cahow EN E
- Black-capped petrel, Pterodroma hasitata EN
- Black-vented shearwater, Puffinus opisthomelas NT
- Buller's shearwater, Ardenna bulleri VU
- Bulwer's petrel, Bulweria bulwerii (A) LC
- Cape Verde shearwater, Calonectris edwardsii (A) NT
- Christmas shearwater, Puffinus nativitatis (A) LC
- Cook's petrel, Pterodroma cookii VU
- Cory's shearwater, Calonectris diomedea LC
- Fea's petrel Pterodroma feae NT
- Flesh-footed shearwater, Ardenna carneipes NT
- Galapagos petrel, Pterodroma phaeopygia (A) CR
- Galapagos shearwater, Puffinus subalaris (A) LC
- Gray-faced petrel, Pterodroma gouldi (A) LC
- Great shearwater, Ardenna gravis LC
- Hawaiian petrel Pterodroma sandwichensis (C) EN
- Herald petrel, Pterodroma heraldica (A) LC
- Jamaican petrel, Pterodoma caribbea (E?) CR
- Juan Fernandez petrel, Pterodroma externa (A) VU
- Kermadec petrel, Pterodroma neglecta (A) LC
- Manx shearwater, Puffinus puffinus LC
- Mottled petrel, Pterodroma inexpectata NT
- Murphy's petrel, Pterodroma ultima LC
- Newell's shearwater Puffinus newelli CR
- Northern fulmar, Fulmarus glacialis LC
- Northern giant-petrel, Macronectes halli (A) LC
- Parkinson's petrel, Procellaria parkinsoni VU
- Pink-footed shearwater, Ardenna creatopus VU
- Providence petrel, Pterodroma solandri (A) VU
- Short-tailed shearwater, Ardenna tenuirostris LC
- Sooty shearwater, Ardenna grisea NT
- Stejneger's petrel, Pterodroma longirostris (C) VU
- Streaked shearwater, Calonectris leucomelas (C) NT
- Tahiti petrel, Pseudobulweria rostrata (A) NT
- Townsend's shearwater, Puffinus auricularis (A) CR
- Trindade petrel, Pterodroma arminjoniana VU
- Wedge-tailed shearwater, Ardenna pacifica (C) LC}
- White-chinned petrel, Procellaria aequinoctialis (A) VU
- Zino's petrel, Pterodroma madeira (A) EN

== Storks ==
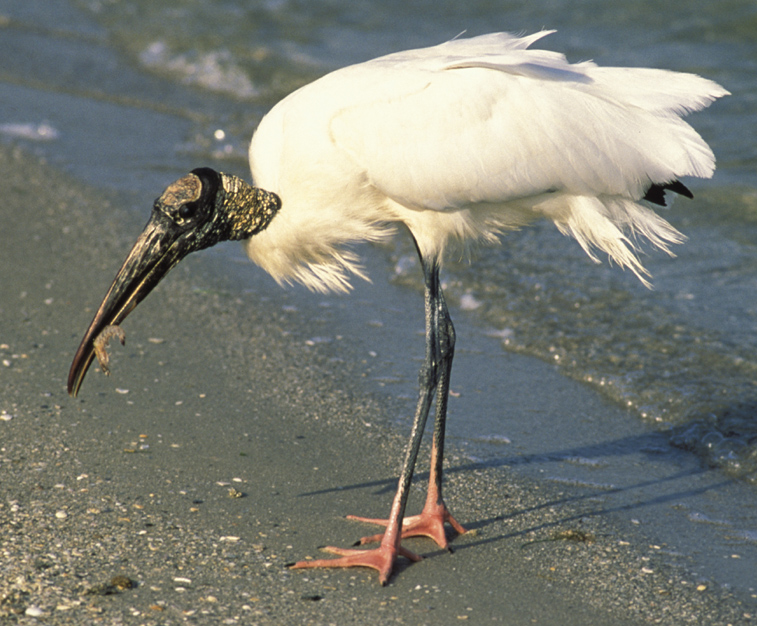
Wood stork

Order: Ciconiiformes Family: Ciconiidae

Storks are large, heavy, long-legged, long-necked wading birds with long stout bills and wide wingspans. They lack the powder down that other wading birds such as herons, spoonbills and ibises use to clean off fish slime. Storks lack a pharynx and are mute.

- Jabiru, Jabiru mycteria LC
- Maguari stork, Ciconia maguari (A) LC
- White stork, Ciconia cionia (A) LC
- Wood stork, Mycteria americana LC E

== Frigatebirds ==
Order: Suliformes Family: Fregatidae

Frigatebirds are large seabirds usually found over tropical oceans. They are large, black or black and white, with long wings and deeply forked tails. The males have colored inflatable throat pouches. They do not swim or walk and cannot take off from a flat surface. Having the largest wingspan-to-body-weight ratio of any bird, they are essentially aerial, able to stay aloft for more than a week.

- Great frigatebird, Fregata minor LC
- Lesser frigatebird, Fregata ariel (A) LC
- Magnificent frigatebird, Fregata magnificens LC

== Boobies and gannets ==
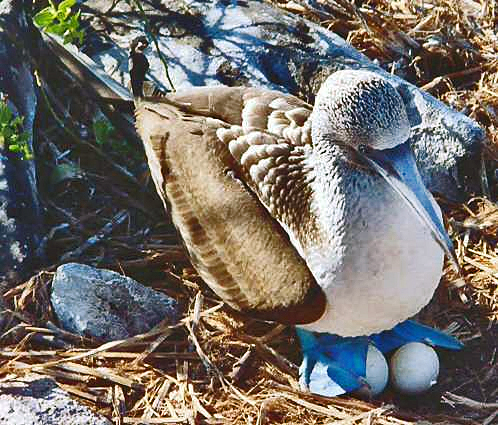
Blue-footed booby

Order: Suliformes Family: Sulidae

The sulids comprise the gannets and boobies. Both groups are medium-large coastal seabirds that plunge-dive for fish.

- Blue-footed booby, Sula nebouxii LC
- Brown booby, Sula leucogaster LC
- Masked booby, Sula dactylatra LC
- Nazca booby, Sula granti LC
- Northern gannet, Morus bassanus LC
- Peruvian booby, Sula variegata (A) LC
- Red-footed booby, Sula sula LC

== Darters ==
Order: Suliformes Family: Anhingidae

Darters or anhingas are cormorant-like water birds with very long necks and long, straight beaks. They are fish eaters which often swim with only their neck above the water.

- Anhinga, Anhinga anhinga LC

== Cormorants and shags ==
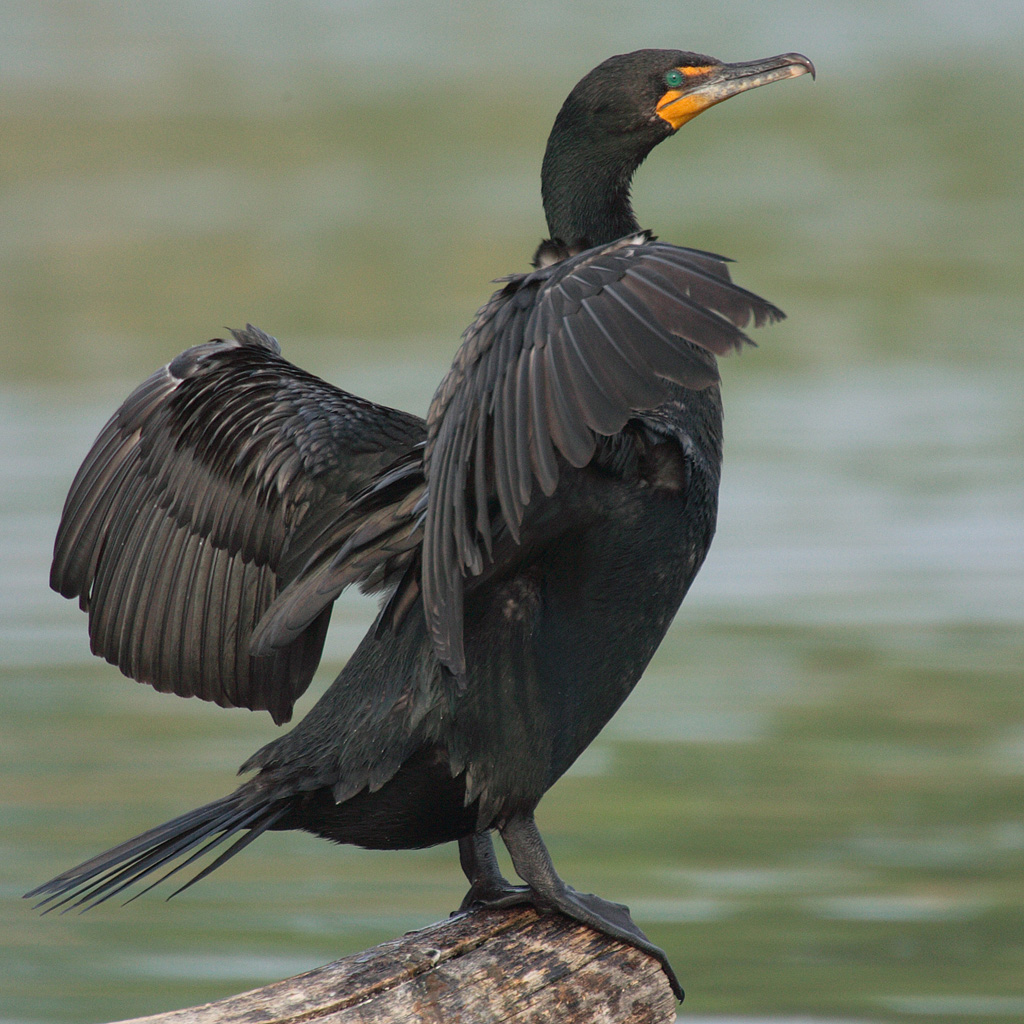
Double-crested cormorant

Order: Suliformes Family: Phalacrocoracidae

Cormorants are medium-to-large aquatic birds, usually with mainly dark plumage and areas of colored skin on the face. The bill is long, thin and sharply hooked. Their feet are four-toed and webbed.

- Brandt's cormorant, Urile penicillatus LC
- Double-crested cormorant, Nannopterum auritum LC
- Great cormorant, Phalacrocorax carbo LC
- Guanay cormorant, Leucocarbo bougainvilliorum (A) LC
- Neotropic cormorant, Nannopterum brasilianum LC
- Pelagic cormorant, Urile pelagicus LC
- Red-faced cormorant, Urile urile LC

== Pelicans ==
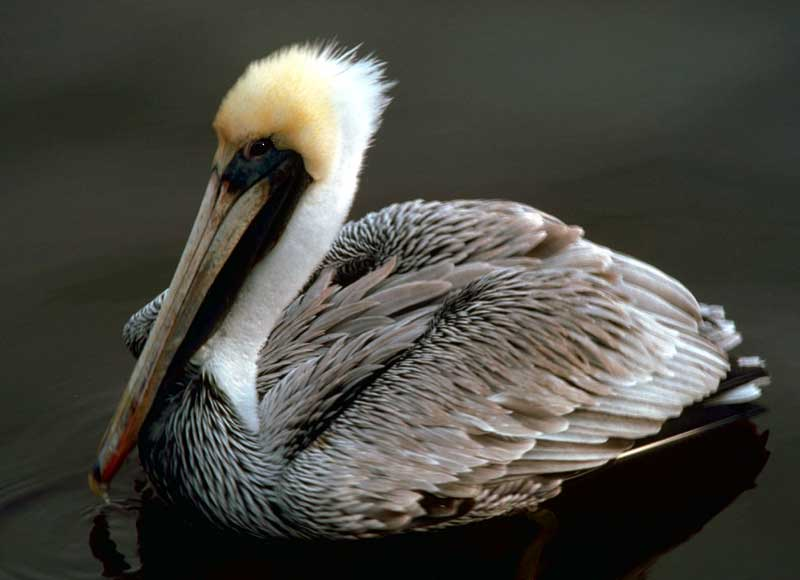
Brown pelican

Order: Pelecaniformes Family: Pelecanidae

Pelicans are very large water birds with a distinctive pouch under their beak. Like other birds in the order Pelecaniformes, they have four webbed toes.

- American white pelican, Pelecanus erythrorhynchos LC
- Brown pelican, Pelecanus occidentalis LC
- Great white pelican, Pelecanus onocrotalus (A) LC
- Peruvian pelican, Pelecanus thagus (A) NT

== Herons, egrets, and bitterns ==
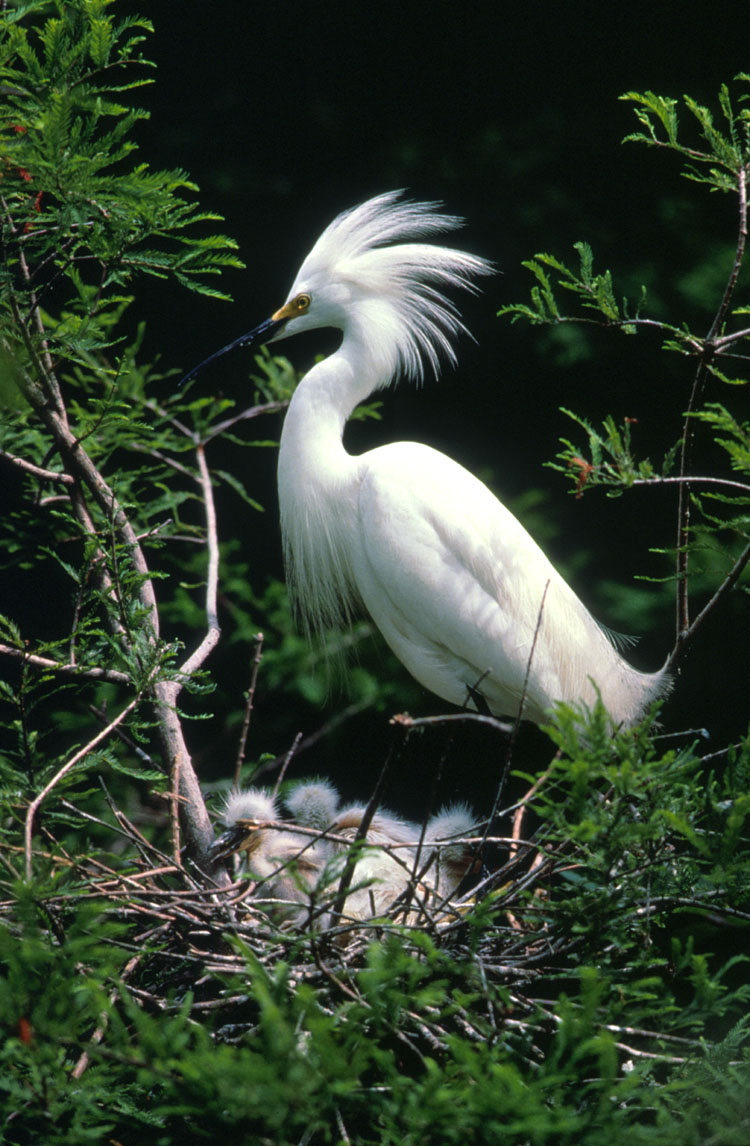
Snowy egret

Order: Pelecaniformes Family: Ardeidae

The family Ardeidae contains the herons, egrets and bitterns. Herons and egrets are medium to large wading birds with long necks and legs. Bitterns tend to be shorter necked and more secretive. Members of Ardeidae fly with their necks retracted, unlike other long-necked birds such as storks, ibises and spoonbills.

- Agami heron, Agamia agami VU
- American bittern, Botaurus lentiginosus LC
- Bare-throated tiger-heron, Tigrisoma mexicanum LC
- Black-crowned night-heron, Nycticorax nycticorax LC
- Boat-billed heron, Cochlearius cochlearius LC
- Capped heron, Pilherodius pileatus LC
- Cattle egret, Bubulcus ibis LC
- Chinese egret, Egretta eulophotes (A) VU E
- Chinese pond-heron, Ardeola bacchus (A) LC
- Cocoi heron, Ardea cocoi LC
- Fasciated tiger-heron, Tigrisoma fasciatum LC
- Gray heron, Ardea cinerea LC
- Great blue heron, Ardea herodias LC
- Great egret, Ardea alba LC
- Green heron, Butorides virescens LC
- Intermediate egret, Ardea intermedia (A) LC
- Least bittern, Ixobrychus exilis LC
- Little bittern, Ixobrychus minutus (A) LC
- Little blue heron, Egretta caerulea LC
- Little egret, Egretta garzetta (C) LC
- Pinnated bittern, Botaurus pinnatus LC
- Purple heron, Ardea purpurea (A) LC
- Reddish egret, Egretta rufescens NT
- Rufescent tiger-heron, Tigrisoma lineatum LC
- Snowy egret, Egretta thula LC
- Squacco heron, Ardeola ralloides (A) LC
- Striated heron, Butorides striata LC
- Stripe-backed bittern, Ixobrychus involucris LC
- Tricolored heron, Egretta tricolor LC
- Western reef-heron, Egretta gularis (A) LC
- Whistling heron, Syrigma sibilatrix (A) LC
- Yellow bittern, Ixobrychus sinensis (A) LC
- Yellow-crowned night-heron, Nyctanassa violacea LC

== Ibises and spoonbills ==
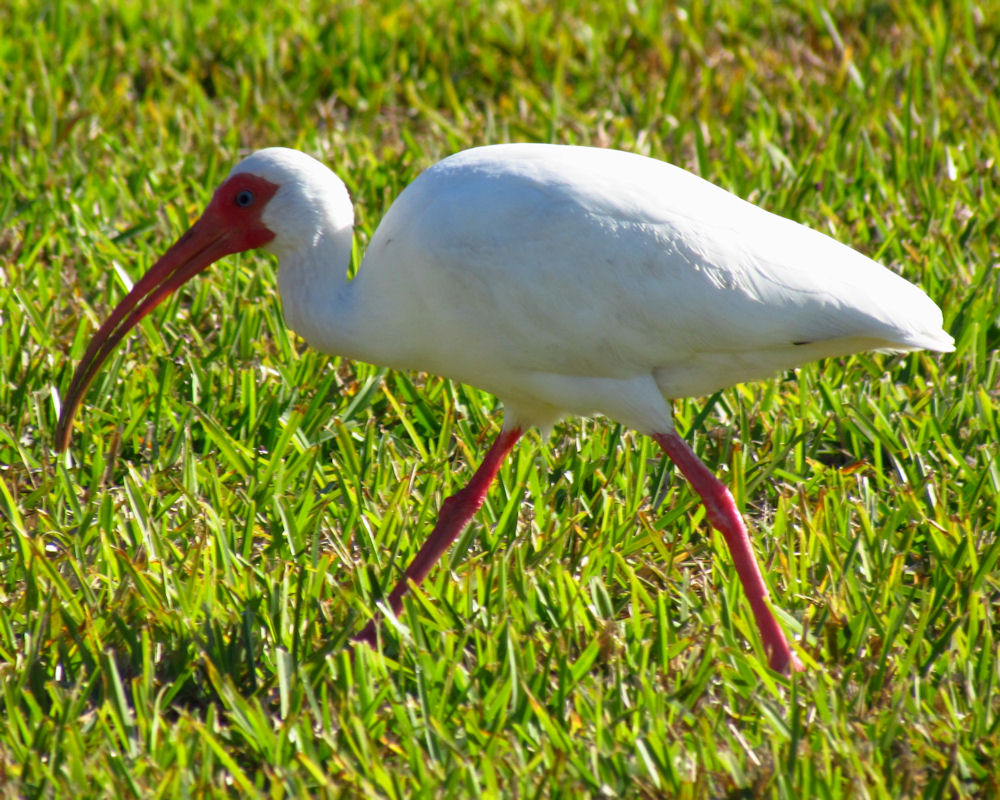
American white ibis

Order: Pelecaniformes Family: Threskiornithidae

Members of this family have long, broad wings, are strong fliers and, rather surprisingly, given their size and weight, very capable soarers. The body tends to be elongated, the neck more so, with rather long legs. The bill is also long, decurved in the case of the ibises, straight and distinctively flattened in the spoonbills.

- African sacred ibis, Threskiornis aethiopicus (I) LC
- White ibis, Eudocimus albus LC
- Bare-faced ibis, Phimosus infuscatus (A) LC
- Buff-necked ibis, Theristicus caudatus (A) LC
- Eurasian spoonbill, Platalea leucorodia (A) LC
- Glossy ibis, Plegadis falcinellus LC
- Green ibis, Mesembrinibis cayennensis LC
- Roseate spoonbill, Platalea ajaja LC
- Scarlet ibis, Eudocimus ruber LC
- White-faced ibis, Plegadis chihi LC

== New World vultures ==
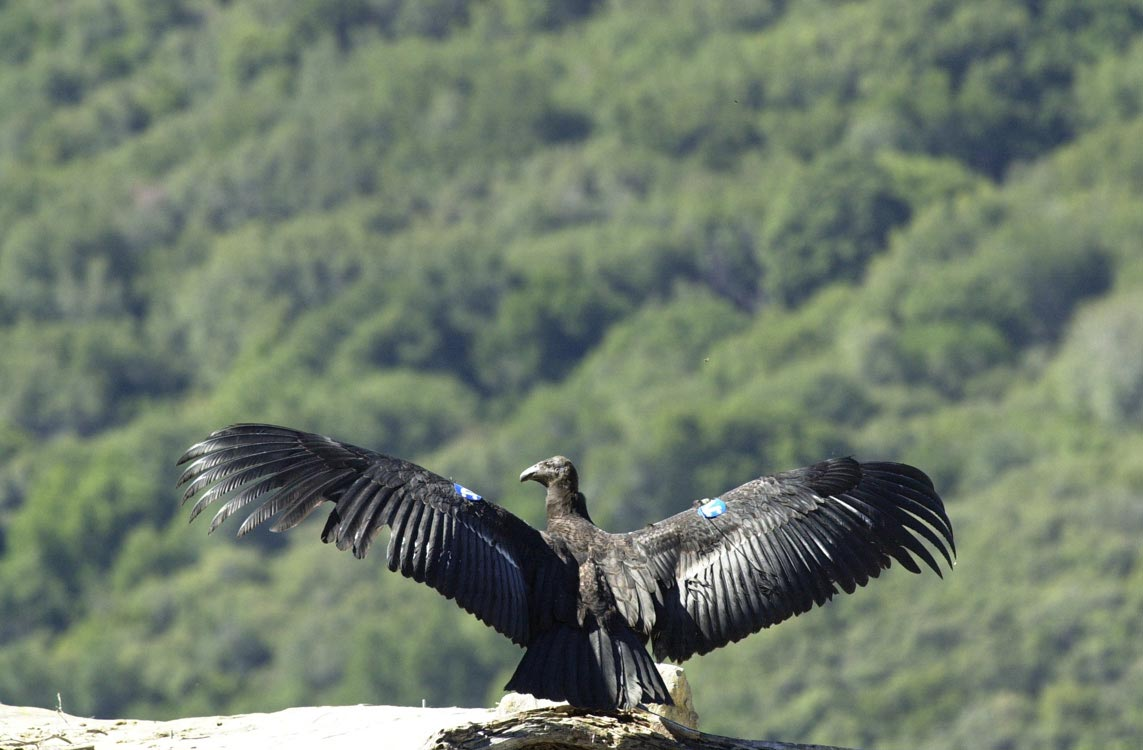
The California condor is one of North America's most endangered birds.

Order: Cathartiformes Family: Cathartidae

The New World vultures are not closely related to Old World vultures, but superficially resemble them because of convergent evolution. Like the Old World vultures, they are scavengers. However, unlike Old World vultures, which find carcasses by sight, New World vultures have a good sense of smell with which they locate carcasses.

- Black vulture, Coragyps atratus LC
- California condor, Gymnogyps californianus CR E (and XN)
- King vulture, Sarcoramphus papa LC
- Lesser yellow-headed vulture, Cathartes burrovianus LC
- Turkey vulture, Cathartes aura LC

== Osprey ==
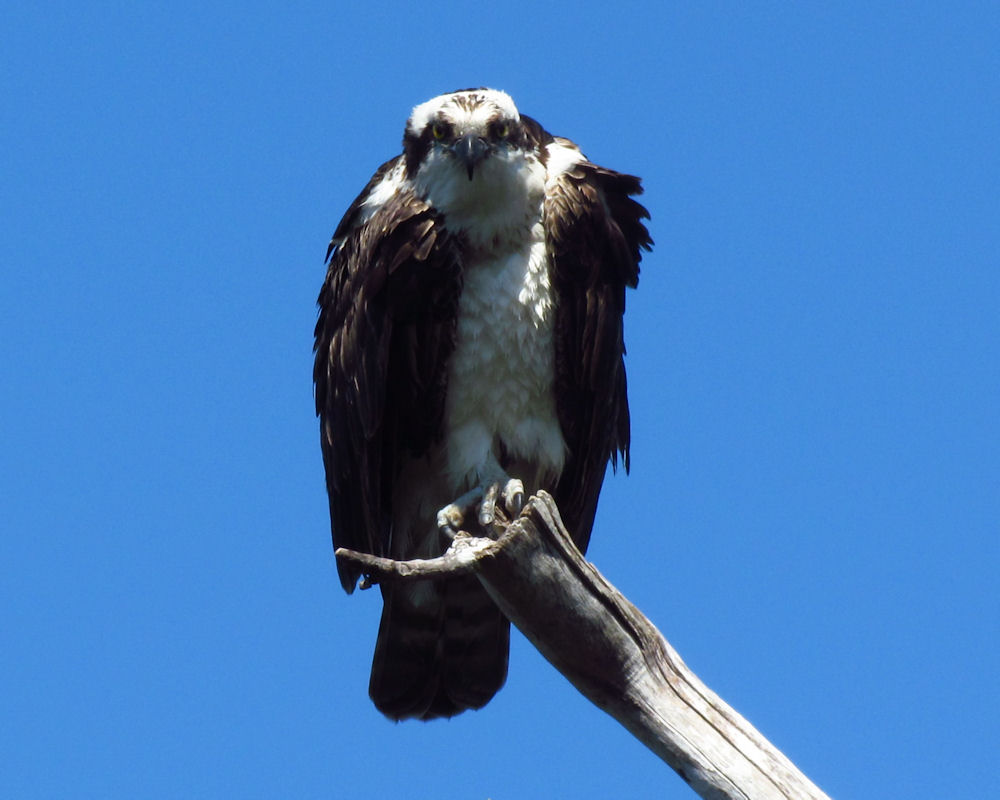
Osprey

Order: Accipitriformes Family: Pandionidae

Pandionidae is a family of fish-eating birds of prey, possessing a very large, powerful hooked beak for tearing flesh from their prey, strong legs, powerful talons and keen eyesight. The family is monotypic.

- Osprey, Pandion haliaetus LC

== Hawks, eagles, and kites ==
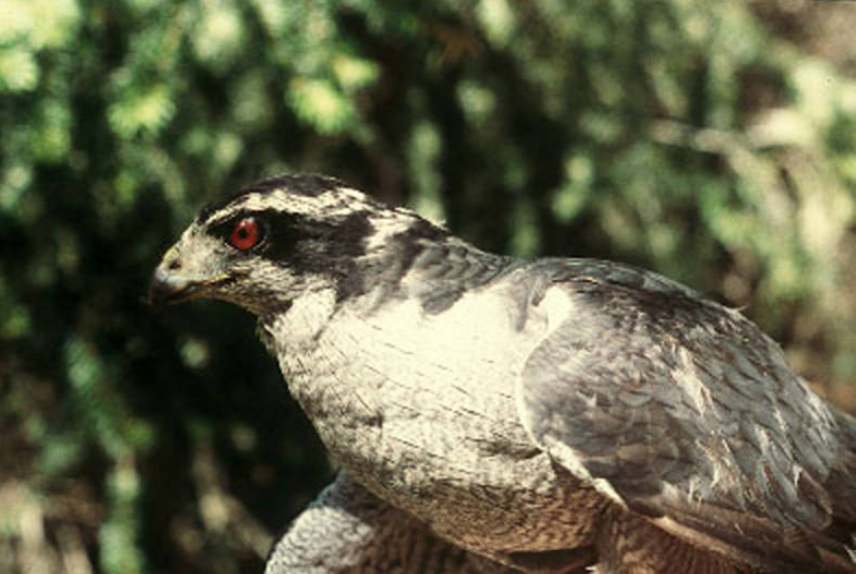
American goshawk

Order: Accipitriformes Family: Accipitridae

Accipitridae is a family of birds of prey, which includes hawks, eagles, kites, harriers and Old World vultures. These birds have very large powerful hooked beaks for tearing flesh from their prey, strong legs, powerful talons and keen eyesight.

- Bald eagle, Haliaeetus leucocephalus LC
- Barred hawk, Morphnarchus princeps LC
- Bicolored hawk, Accipiter bicolor LC
- Black hawk-eagle, Spizaetus tyrannus LC
- Black kite, Milvus migrans (A) LC
- Black-and-white hawk-eagle, Spizaetus melanoleucus LC
- Black-collared hawk, Busarellus nigricollis LC
- Booted eagle, Hieraaetus pennatus (A) LC
- Broad-winged hawk, Buteo platypterus LC (ssp. brunnescens: E)
- Chinese sparrowhawk, Accipiter soloensis (A) LC
- Common black hawk, Buteogallus anthracinus LC
- Cooper's hawk, Accipiter cooperii LC
- Crane hawk, Geranospiza caerulescens LC
- Crested eagle, Morphnus guianensis NT
- Cuban black hawk, Buteogallus gundlachii NT
- Cuban kite, Chondrohierax wilsonii CR
- Double-toothed kite, Harpagus bidentatus LC
- Eurasian sparrowhawk, Accipiter nisus (A) LC
- Ferruginous hawk, Buteo regalis LC
- Golden eagle, Aquila chrysaetos LC
- Great black hawk, Buteogallus urubitinga LC
- Gray hawk, Buteo plagiatus (B. nitidus: LC)
- Gray-bellied hawk, Accipiter poliogaster (A) NT
- Gray-headed kite, Leptodon cayanensis LC
- Gray-lined hawk, Buteo nitidus LC
- Gundlach's hawk, Accipiter gundlachi EN
- Harpy eagle, Harpia harpyja NT E
- Harris's hawk, Parabuteo unicinctus LC
- Hook-billed kite, Chondrohierax uncinatus LC
- Long-legged buzzard, Buteo rufinus (A) LC
- Long-winged harrier, Circus buffoni LC
- Mississippi kite, Ictinia mississippiensis LC
- Eurasian goshawk, Accipiter gentilis (A) LC
- American goshawk, Accipiter atricapillus LC
- Northern harrier, Circus hudsonius LC
- Western marsh harrier, Circus aeruginosus (A) LC
- Ornate hawk-eagle, Spizaetus ornatus NT
- Pearl kite, Gampsonyx swainsonii LC
- Plumbeous hawk, Cryptoleucopteryx plumbea NT
- Plumbeous kite, Ictinia plumbea LC
- Red-shouldered hawk, Buteo lineatus LC
- Red-tailed hawk, Buteo jamaicensis LC
- Ridgway's hawk, Buteo ridgwayi CR
- Roadside hawk, Rupornis magnirostris LC
- Rough-legged hawk, Buteo lagopus LC
- Savanna hawk, Buteogallus meridionalis LC
- Semiplumbeous hawk, Leucopternis semiplumbeus LC
- Sharp-shinned hawk, Accipiter striatus LC (Accipiter striatus venator A. s. venator: E
- Short-tailed hawk, Buteo brachyurus LC
- Slender-billed kite, Helicolestes hamatus LC
- Snail kite, Rostrhamus sociabilis LC (ssp. plumbeus: E)
- Solitary eagle, Buteogallus solitarius NT
- Steller's sea-eagle, Haliaeetus pelagicus (C) VU
- Swainson's hawk, Buteo swainsoni LC
- Swallow-tailed kite, Elanoides forficatus LC
- Tiny hawk, Accipiter superciliosus LC
- Western marsh harrier, Circus aeruginosus (A) LC
- White hawk, Pseudastur albicollis LC
- White-tailed eagle, Haliaeetus albicilla (C) LC (ssp. groenlandicus: E)
- White-tailed hawk, Geranoaetus albicaudatus LC
- White-tailed kite, Elanus leucurus LC
- Zone-tailed hawk, Buteo albonotatus LC

== Barn owls ==
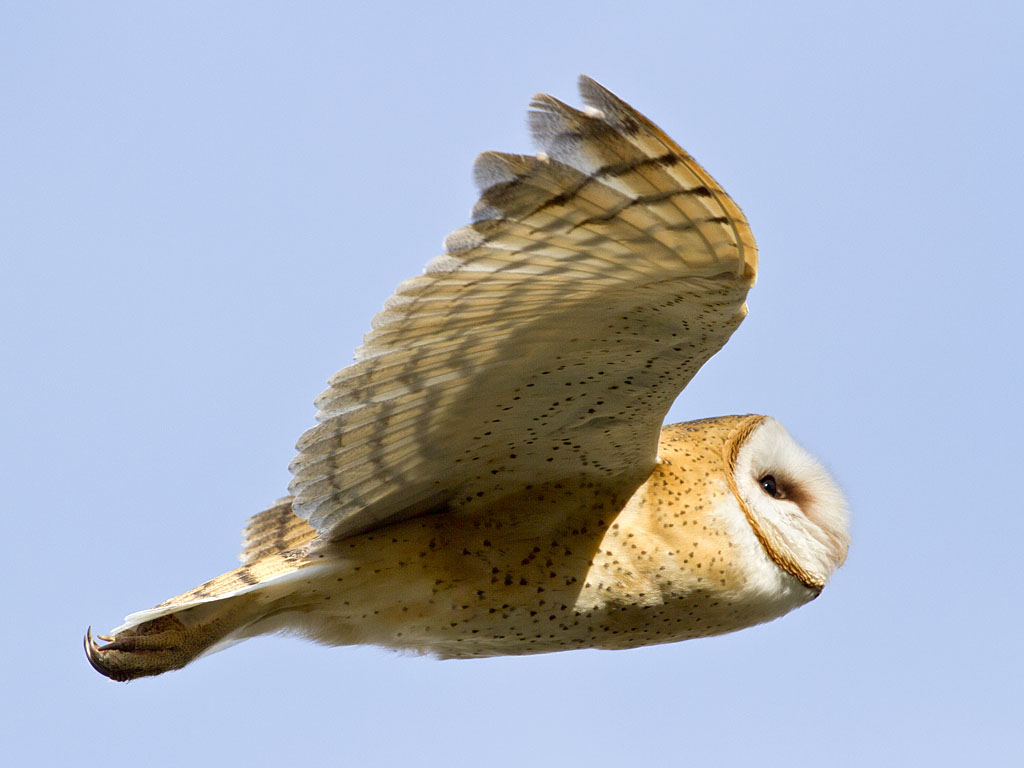
American barn owl

Order: Strigiformes Family: Tytonidae

Barn owls are medium to large owls with large heads and characteristic heart-shaped faces. They have long strong legs with powerful talons.

- American barn owl, Tyto furcata LC
- Ashy-faced owl, Tyto glaucops LC

== Owls ==
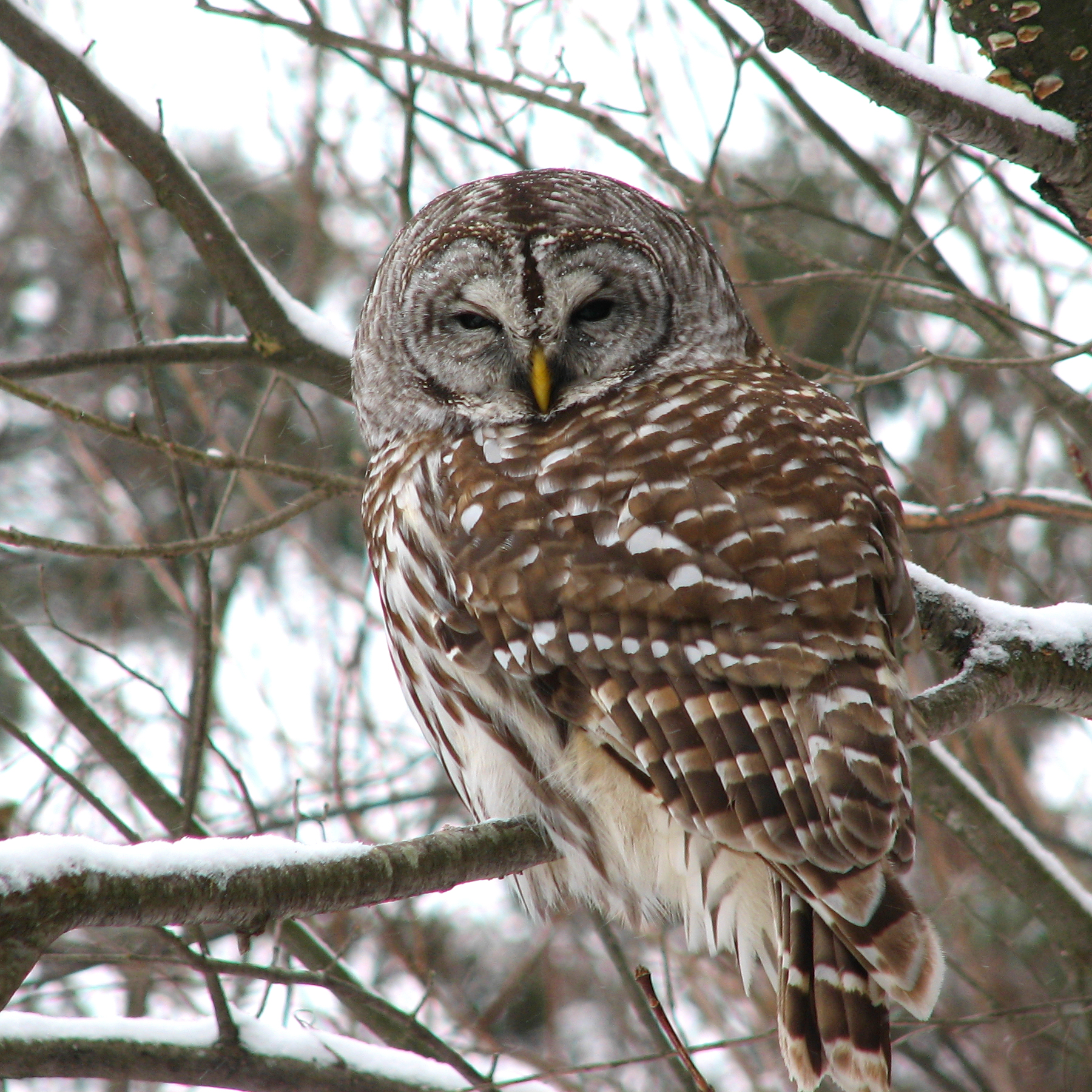
Barred owl

Order: Strigiformes Family: Strigidae

Typical owls are small to large solitary nocturnal birds of prey. They have large forward-facing eyes and ears, a hawk-like beak and a conspicuous circle of feathers around each eye called a facial disk.

- Balsas screech-owl, Megascops seductus LC
- Bare-legged owl, Margarobyas lawrencii LC
- Bare-shanked screech-owl, Megascops clarkii LC
- Barred owl, Strix varia LC
- Bearded screech-owl, Megascops barbarus LC
- Bermuda saw-whet owl, Aegolius gradyi (E) EX
- Black-and-white owl, Strix nigrolineata LC
- Boreal owl, Aegolius funereus LC
- Burrowing owl, Athene cunicularia LC
- Central American pygmy-owl, Glaucidium griseiceps LC
- Choco screech-owl, Megascops centralis
- Cinereous owl, Strix sartorii
- Colima pygmy-owl, Glaucidium palmarum LC
- Costa Rican pygmy-owl, Glaucidium costaricanum LC
- Crested owl, Lophostrix cristata LC
- Cuban pygmy-owl, Glaucidium siju LC
- Eastern screech-owl, Megascops asio LC
- Elf owl, Micrathene whitneyi LC
- Ferruginous pygmy-owl, Glaucidium brasilianum LC
- Flammulated owl, Psiloscops flammeolus LC
- Fulvous owl, Strix fulvescens LC
- Great gray owl, Strix nebulosa LC
- Great horned owl, Bubo virginianus LC
- Jamaican owl, Asio grammicus LC
- Long-eared owl, Asio otus LC
- Middle American screech-owl, Megascops guatemalae LC
- Mottled owl, Strix virgata LC
- Northern boobook, Ninox japonica (A)
- Northern hawk owl, Surnia ulula LC
- Northern pygmy-owl, Glaucidium gnoma LC
- Northern saw-whet owl, Aegolius acadicus LC
- Oriental scops-owl, Otus sunia (A) LC
- Pacific screech-owl, Megascops cooperi LC
- Puerto Rican owl, Gymnasio nudipes LC
- Short-eared owl, Asio flammeus LC
- Snowy owl, Bubo scandiacus VU
- Spectacled owl, Pulsatrix perspicillata LC
- Spotted owl, Strix occidentalis NT (Mexican spotted owl S. o. lucida and northern spotted owl S. o. caurina: T)
- Striped owl, Asio clamator LC
- Stygian owl, Asio stygius LC
- Tamaulipas pygmy-owl, Glaucidium sanchezi NT
- Tropical screech-owl, Megascops choliba LC
- Unspotted saw-whet owl, Aegolius ridgwayi LC
- Western screech-owl, Megascops kennicottii LC
- Whiskered screech-owl, Megascops trichopsis LC

== Trogons ==
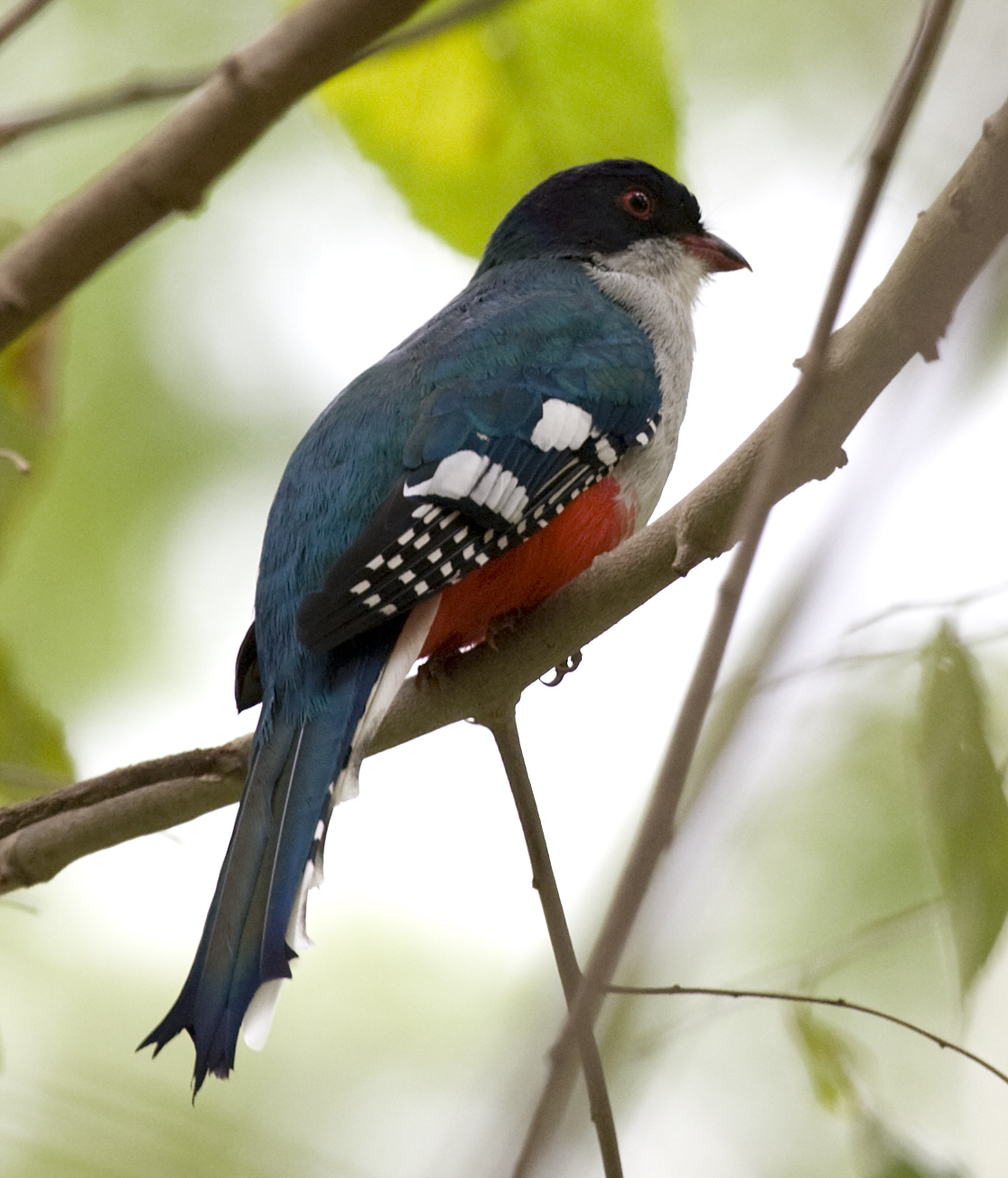
Cuban trogon

Order: Trogoniformes Family: Trogonidae

Trogons are residents of tropical forests worldwide and have soft, often colorful, feathers with distinctive male and female plumage. They have compact bodies with long tails and short necks.

- Baird's trogon, Trogon bairdii NT
- Black-headed trogon, Trogon melanocephalus LC
- Black-tailed trogon, Trogon melanurus LC
- Black-throated trogon, Trogon rufus LC
- Citreoline trogon, Trogon citreolus LC
- Collared trogon, Trogon collaris LC
- Cuban trogon, Priotelus temnurus LC
- Eared quetzal, Euptilotis neoxenus LC
- Elegant trogon, Trogon elegans LC
- Gartered trogon, Trogon caligatus LC
- Golden-headed quetzal, Pharomachrus auriceps LC
- Green-backed trogon, Trogon viridis LC
- Guianan trogon, Trogon violaceus LC
- Hispaniolan trogon, Priotelus roseigaster LC
- Lattice-tailed trogon, Trogon clathratus LC
- Mountain trogon, Trogon mexicanus LC
- Resplendent quetzal, Pharomachrus mocinno NT E
- Slaty-tailed trogon, Trogon massena LC
- White-tailed trogon, Trogon chionurus LC

== Hoopoes ==
Order: Upupiformes Family: Upupidae

This black, white and pink bird is quite unmistakable, especially in its erratic flight, which is like that of a giant butterfly. There are three members of its family. The song is a trisyllabic oop-oop-oop, which gives rise to its English and scientific names.

- Eurasian hoopoe, Upupa epops (A) LC

== Todies ==
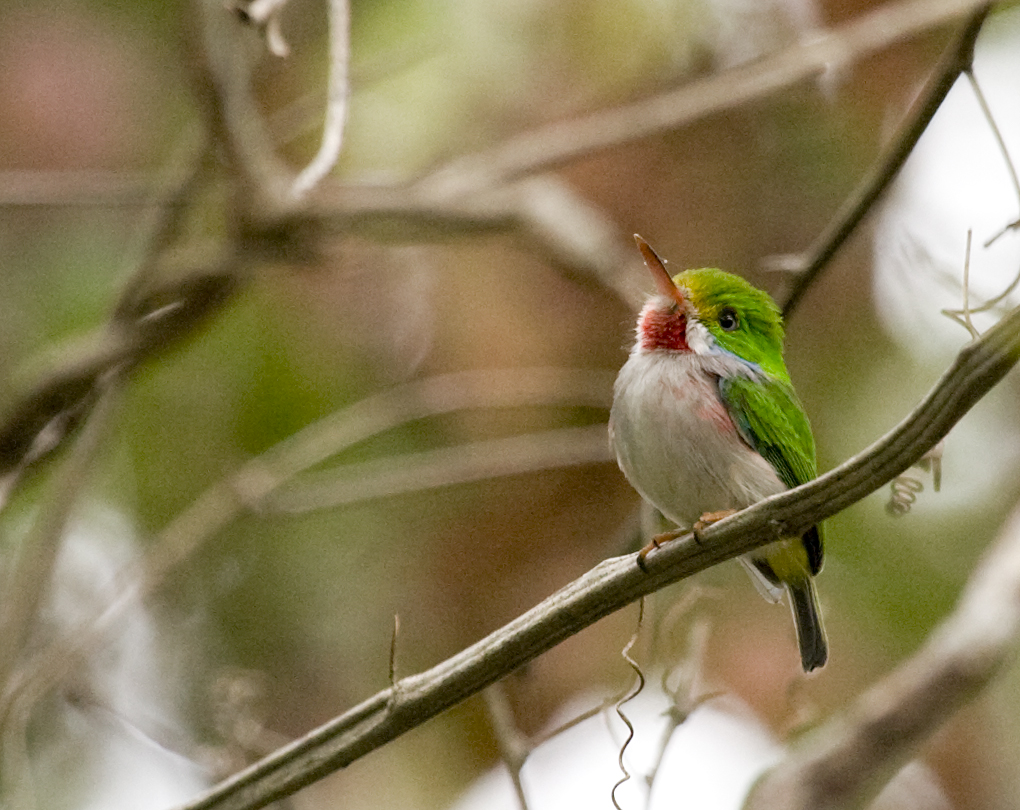
Cuban tody

Order: Coraciiformes Family: Todidae

Todies are a group of small forest species endemic to the Caribbean. These birds have colorful plumage and resemble small kingfishers, but have flattened bills with serrated edges. They eat small prey such as insects and lizards.

- Cuban tody, Todus multicolor LC
- Broad-billed tody, Todus subulatus LC
- Jamaican tody, Todus todus LC
- Narrow-billed tody, Todus angustirostris LC
- Puerto Rican tody, Todus mexicanus LC

== Motmots ==
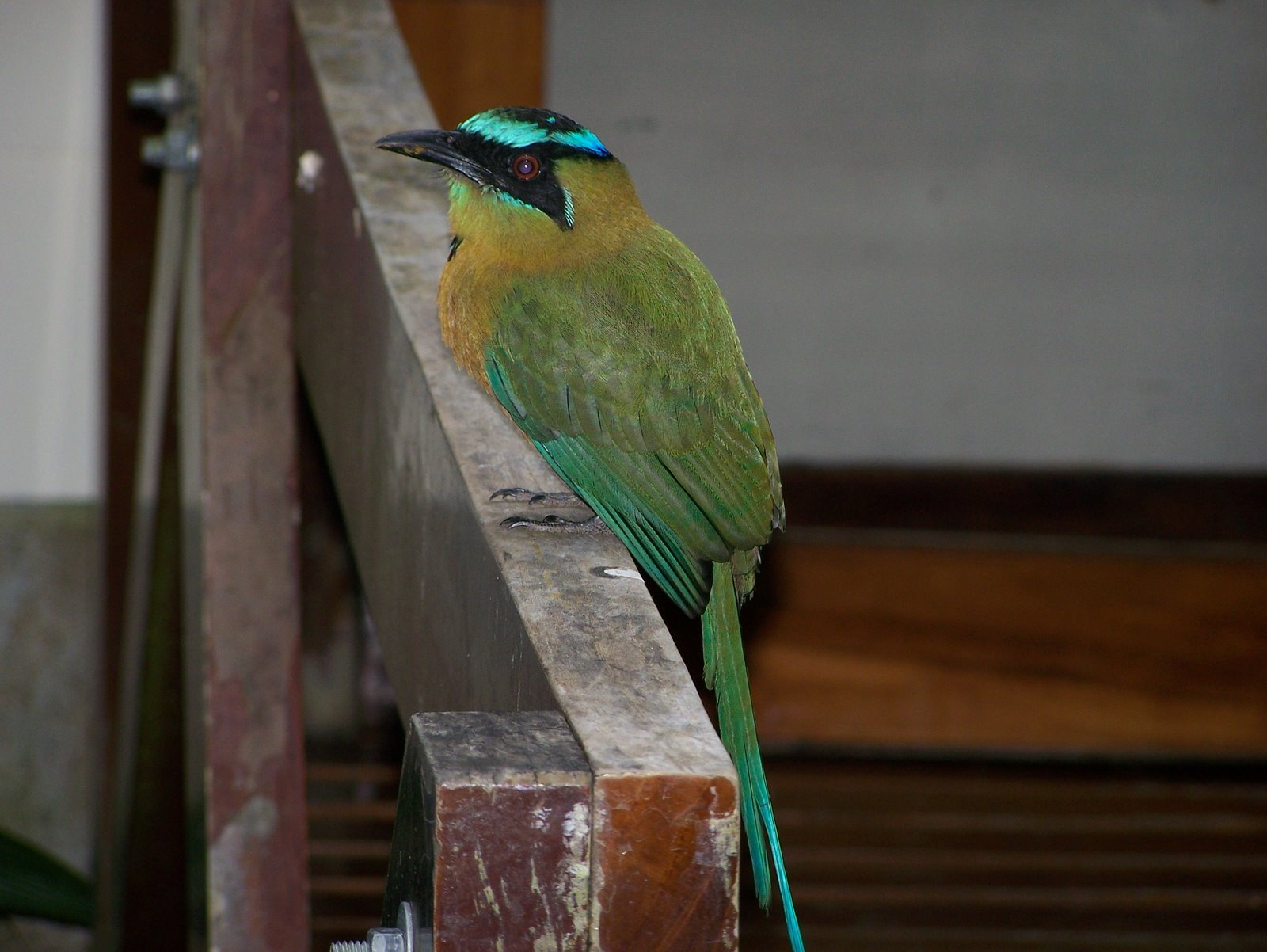
Lesson's motmot

Order: Coraciiformes Family: Motmotidae

The motmots have colorful plumage and long, graduated tails which they display by waggling back and forth. In most of the species, the barbs near the ends of the two longest (central) tail feathers are weak and fall off, leaving a length of bare shaft and creating a racket-shaped tail.

- Blue-capped motmot, Momotus coeruliceps LC
- Blue-throated motmot, Aspatha gularis LC
- Broad-billed motmot, Electron platyrhynchum LC
- Keel-billed motmot, Electron carinatum VU
- Lesson's motmot, Momotus lessonii LC
- Rufous motmot, Baryphthengus martii LC
- Russet-crowned motmot, Momotus mexicanus LC
- Tody motmot, Hylomanes momotula LC
- Trinidad motmot, Momotus bahamensis LC
- Turquoise-browed motmot, Eumomota superciliosa LC
- Whooping motmot, Momotus subrufescens LC

== Kingfishers ==
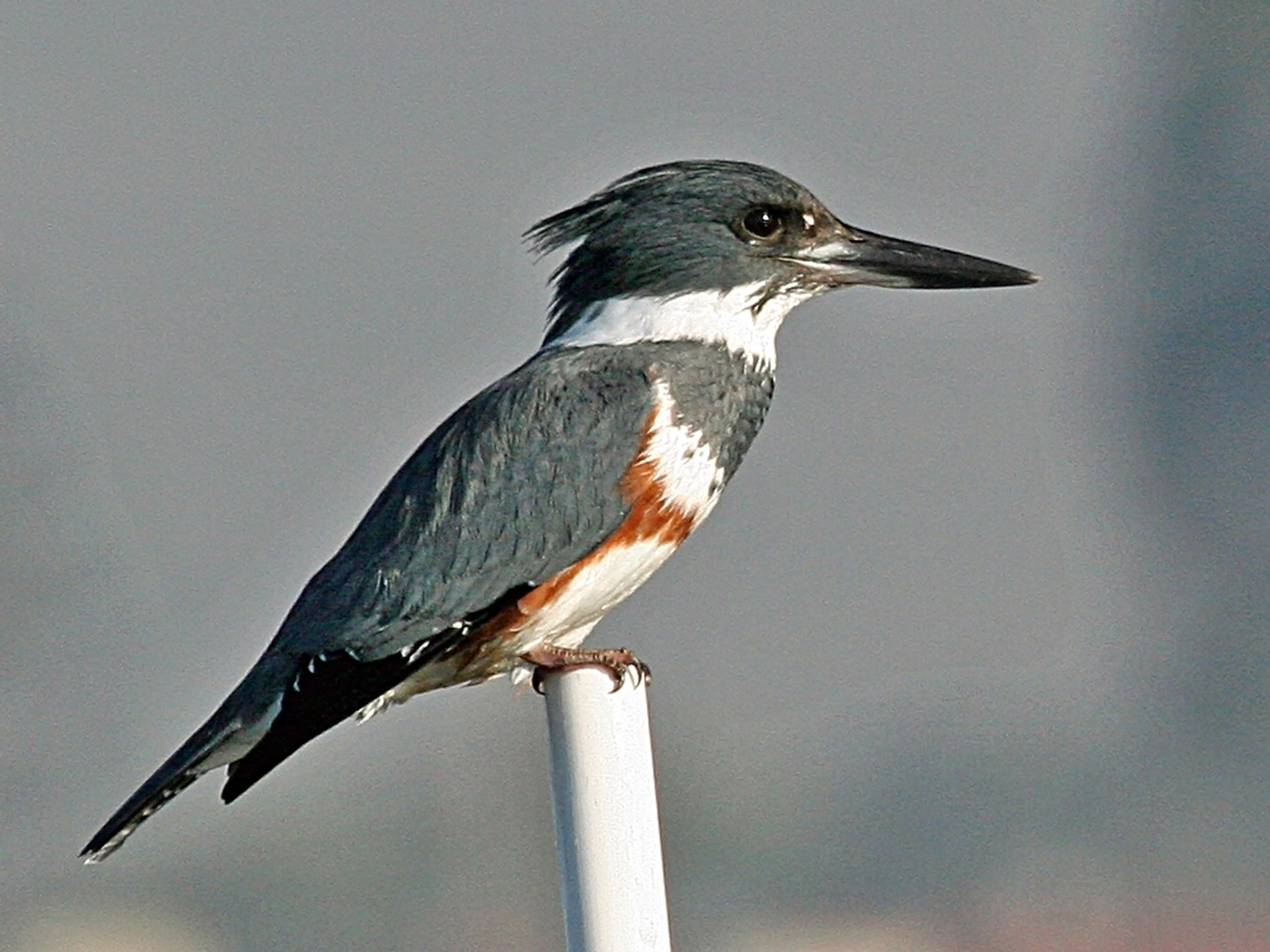
Belted kingfisher

Order: Coraciiformes Family: Alcedinidae

Kingfishers are medium-sized birds with large heads, long pointed bills, short legs and stubby tails.

- Amazon kingfisher, Chloroceryle amazona LC
- American pygmy kingfisher, Chloroceryle aenea LC
- Belted kingfisher, Megaceryle alcyon LC
- Green kingfisher, Chloroceryle americana LC
- Green-and-rufous kingfisher, Chloroceryle inda LC
- Ringed kingfisher, Megaceryle torquata LC

== Bee-eaters ==
Order: Coraciiformes Family: Meropidae

The bee-eaters are a group of birds in the family Meropidae. They are characterized by richly colored plumage, slender bodies and usually elongated central tail feathers. All are colorful and have long downturned bills and pointed wings, which give them a swallow-like appearance when seen from afar.

- European bee-eater, Merops apiaster (A) LC

== Puffbirds ==
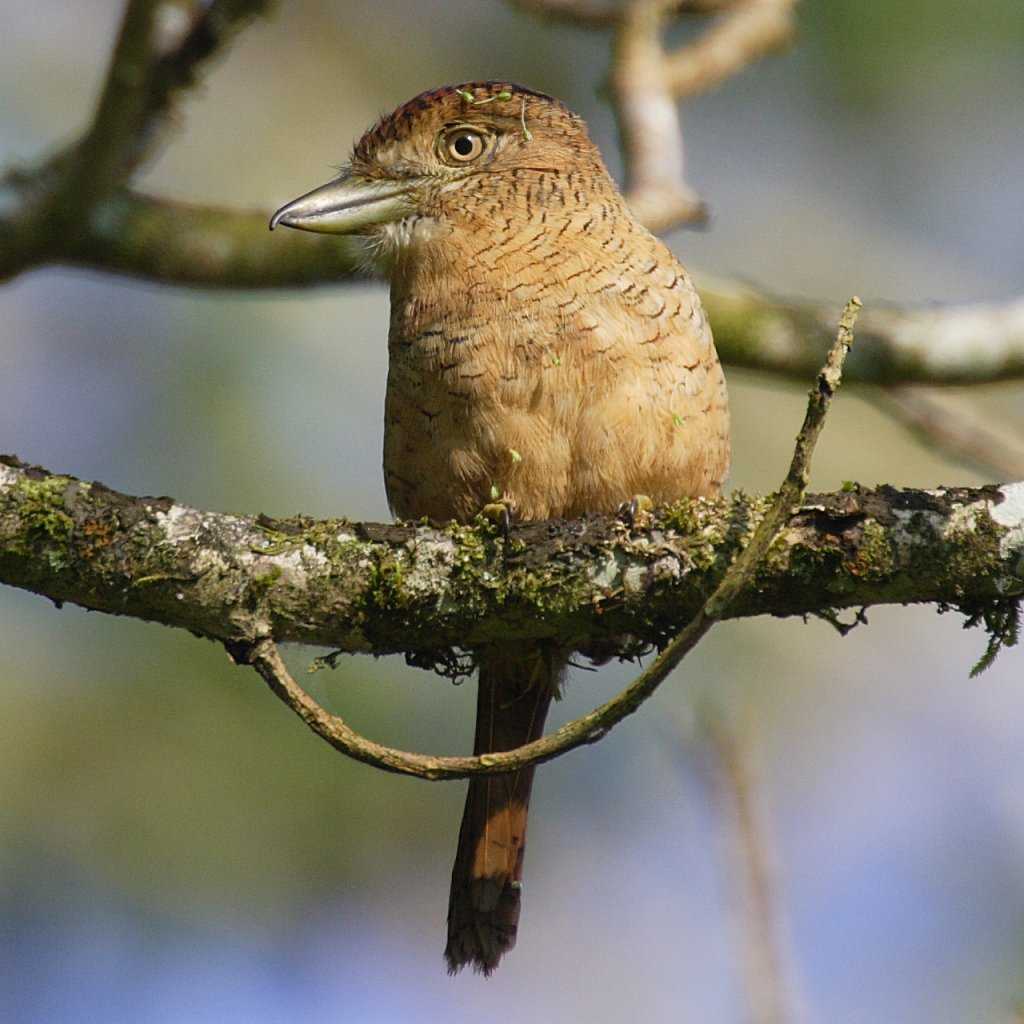
Barred puffbird

Order: Piciformes Family: Bucconidae

The puffbirds are related to the jacamars and have the same range, but lack the iridescent colors of that family. They are mainly brown, rufous, or gray, with large heads and flattened bills with hooked tips. The loose abundant plumage and short tails makes them look stout and puffy, giving rise to the English common name of the family.

- Barred puffbird, Nystalus radiatus LC
- Black-breasted puffbird, Notharchus pectoralis LC
- Gray-cheeked nunlet, Nonnula frontalis LC
- Lanceolated monklet, Micromonacha lanceolata LC
- Pied puffbird, Notharchus tectus LC
- Russet-throated puffbird, Hypnelus ruficollis LC
- White-fronted nunbird, Monasa morphoeus LC
- White-necked puffbird, Notharchus hyperrhynchus LC
- White-whiskered puffbird, Malacoptila panamensis LC

== Jacamars ==
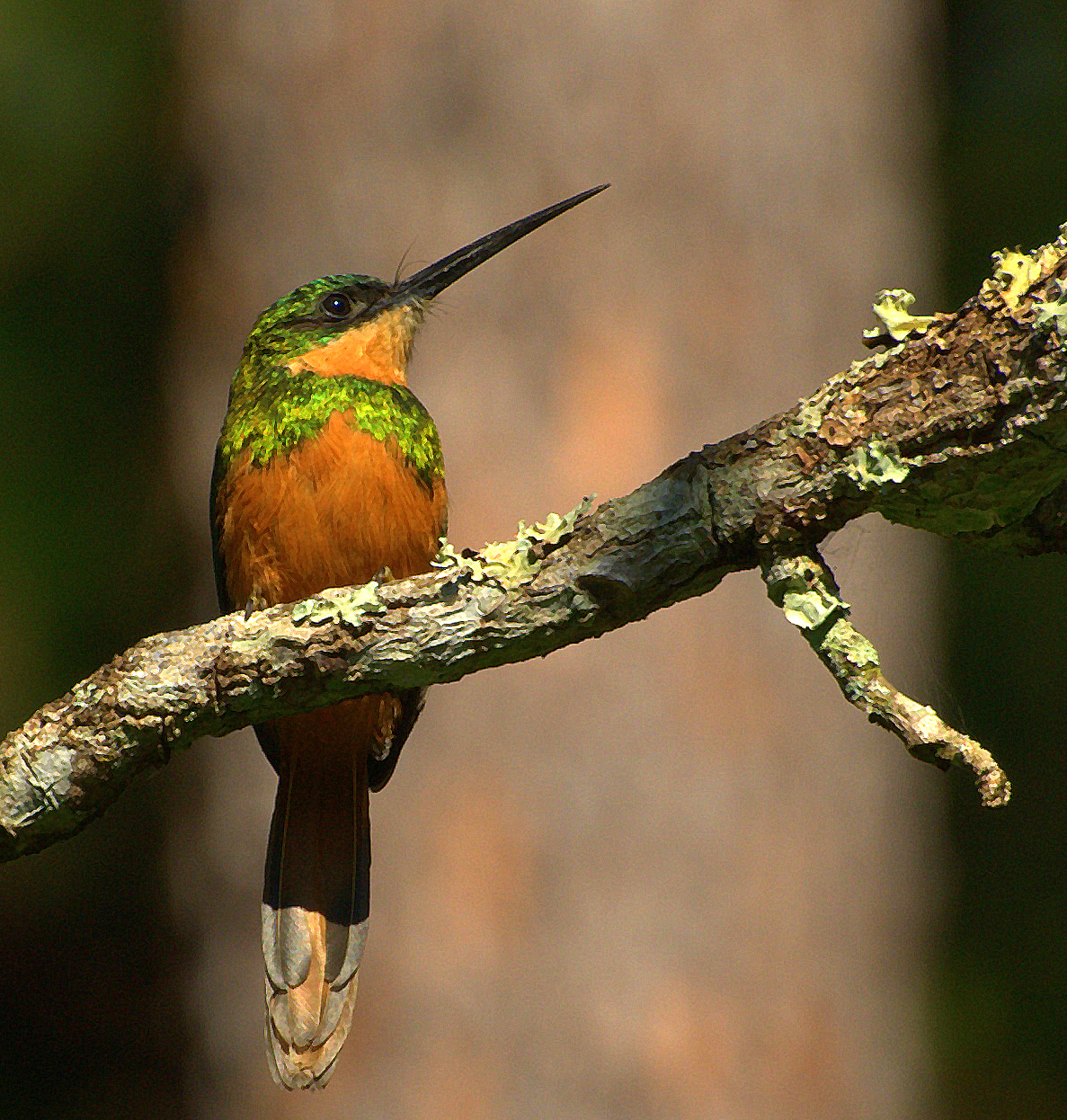
Rufous-tailed jacamar

Order: Piciformes Family: Galbulidae

The jacamars are birds from tropical South America, with a range that extends up to Mexico. They feed on insects caught on the wing, and are glossy, elegant birds with long bills and tails. In appearance and behavior they resemble the Old World bee-eaters, although they are more closely related to puffbirds.

- Dusky-backed jacamar, Brachygalba salmoni LC
- Great jacamar, Jacamerops aureus LC
- Rufous-tailed jacamar, Galbula ruficauda LC

== New World barbets ==
Order: Piciformes Family: Capitonidae

The barbets are plump birds, with short necks and large heads. They get their name from the bristles which fringe their heavy bills. Most species are brightly colored.

- Red-headed barbet, Eubucco bourcierii LC
- Spot-crowned barbet, Capito maculicoronatus LC

== Toucan-barbets ==
Order: Piciformes Family: Semnornithidae

The toucan-barbets are birds of montane forests in the Neotropics. They are highly social and non-migratory.

- Prong-billed barbet, Semnornis frantzii LC

== Toucans ==
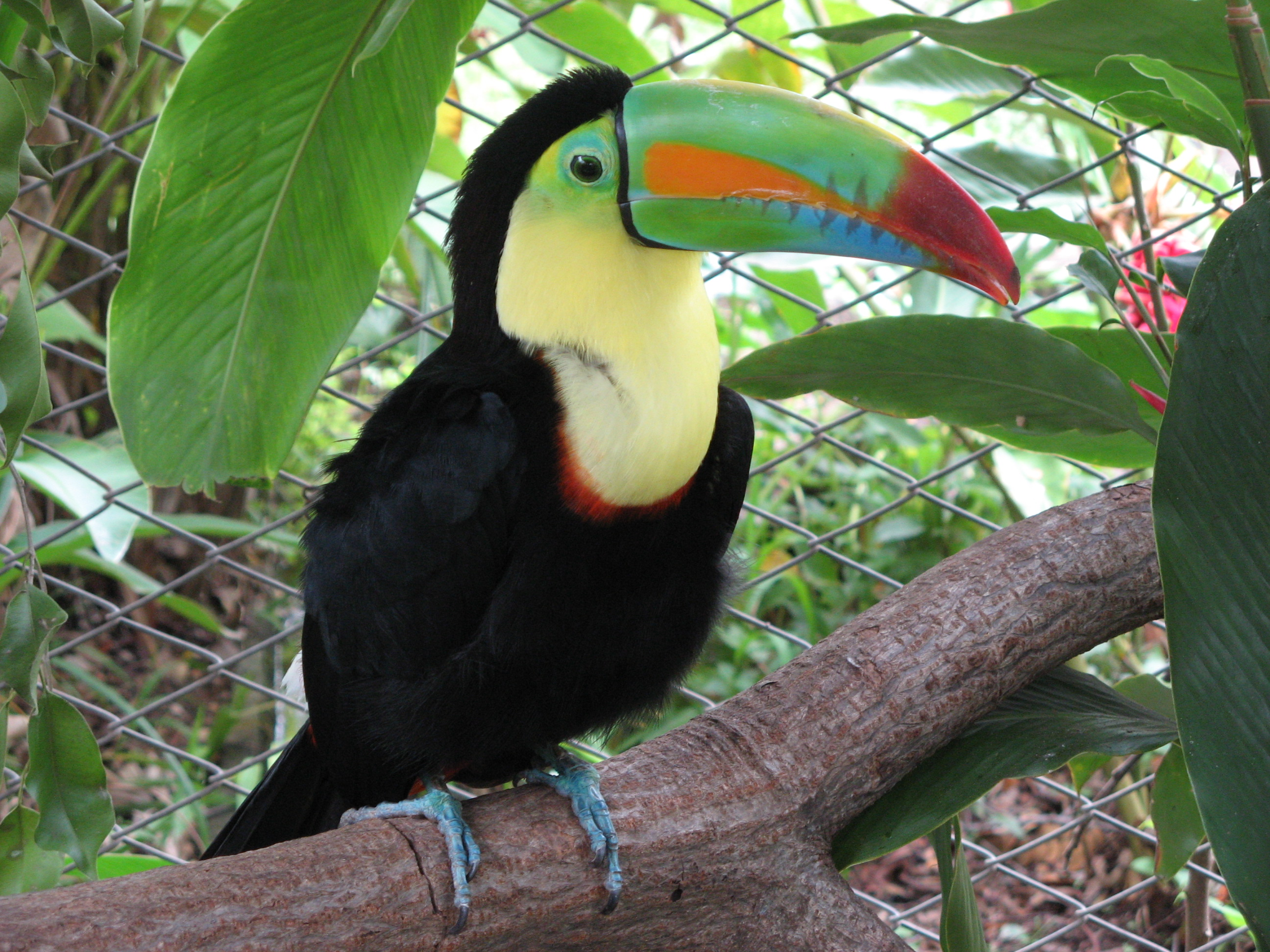
Keel-billed toucan

Order: Piciformes Family: Ramphastidae

Toucans are birds from the Neotropics. They are brightly marked and have enormous, colorful bills which in some species amount to half their body length.

- Channel-billed toucan, Ramphastos vitellinus VU
- Collared aracari, Pteroglossus torquatus LC
- Fiery-billed aracari, Pteroglossus frantzii LC
- Keel-billed toucan, Ramphastos sulfuratus LC
- Northern emerald-toucanet, Aulacorhynchus prasinus LC
- Yellow-eared toucanet, Selenidera spectabilis LC
- Yellow-throated toucan, Ramphastos ambiguus LC

== Woodpeckers ==
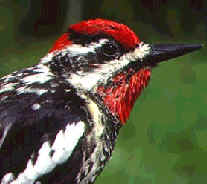
Red-naped sapsucker

Order: Piciformes Family: Picidae

Woodpeckers are small to medium-sized birds with chisel-like beaks, short legs, stiff tails and long tongues used for capturing insects. Some species have feet with two toes pointing forward and two backward, while several species have only three toes. Many woodpeckers have the habit of tapping noisily on tree trunks with their beaks. (See Life histories ... (1939) by A. C. Bent.)

- Acorn woodpecker, Melanerpes formicivorus LC
- American three-toed woodpecker, Picoides dorsalis LC
- Antillean piculet, Nesoctites micromegas LC
- Arizona woodpecker, Dryobates arizonae LC
- Black-backed woodpecker, Picoides arcticus LC
- Black-cheeked woodpecker, Melanerpes pucherani LC
- Chestnut-colored woodpecker, Celeus castaneus LC
- Cinnamon woodpecker, Celeus loricatus LC
- Crimson-bellied woodpecker, Campephilus haematogaster LC
- Crimson-crested woodpecker, Campephilus melanoleucos LC
- Cuban green woodpecker, Xiphidiopicus percussus LC
- Downy woodpecker, Dryobates pubescens LC
- Eurasian wryneck, Jynx torquilla (A) LC
- Fernandina's flicker, Colaptes fernandinae VU
- Gila woodpecker, Melanerpes uropygialis LC
- Gilded flicker, Colaptes chrysoides LC
- Golden-cheeked woodpecker, Melanerpes chrysogenys LC
- Golden-fronted woodpecker, Melanerpes aurifrons LC
- Golden-green woodpecker, Piculus chrysochloros LC
- Golden-naped woodpecker, Melanerpes chrysauchen LC
- Golden-olive woodpecker, Colaptes rubiginosus LC
- Gray-breasted woodpecker, Melanerpes hypopolius LC
- Great spotted woodpecker, Dendrocopos major (A) LC
- Gray-crowned woodpecker, Colaptes auricularis LC
- Guadeloupe woodpecker, Melanerpes herminieri LC
- Hairy woodpecker, Dryobates villosus LC
- Hispaniolan woodpecker, Melanerpes striatus LC
- Hoffmann's woodpecker, Melanerpes hoffmannii LC
- Imperial woodpecker, Campephilus imperialis (E?) CR E
- Ivory-billed woodpecker, Campephilus principalis (E?) CR E
- Jamaican woodpecker, Melanerpes radiolatus LC
- Ladder-backed woodpecker, Dryobates scalaris LC
- Lewis's woodpecker, Melanerpes lewis LC
- Lineated woodpecker, Dryocopus lineatus LC
- Northern flicker, Colaptes auratus LC
- Nuttall's woodpecker, Dryobates nuttallii LC
- Olivaceous piculet, Picumnus olivaceus LC
- Pale-billed woodpecker, Campephilus guatemalensis LC
- Pileated woodpecker, Dryocopus pileatus LC
- Puerto Rican woodpecker, Melanerpes portoricensis LC
- Red-bellied woodpecker, Melanerpes carolinus LC
- Red-breasted sapsucker, Sphyrapicus ruber LC
- Red-cockaded woodpecker, Dryobates borealis NT E
- Red-crowned woodpecker, Melanerpes rubricapillus LC
- Red-headed woodpecker, Melanerpes erythrocephalus LC
- Red-naped sapsucker, Sphyrapicus nuchalis LC
- Red-rumped woodpecker, Dryobates kirkii LC
- Rufous-winged woodpecker, Piculus simplex LC
- Smoky-brown woodpecker, Dryobates fumigatus LC
- Spot-breasted woodpecker, Colaptes punctigula LC
- Strickland's woodpecker, Dryobates stricklandi LC
- Stripe-cheeked woodpecker, Piculus callopterus LC
- West Indian woodpecker, Melanerpes superciliaris LC
- White-headed woodpecker, Dryobates albolarvatus LC
- Williamson's sapsucker, Sphyrapicus thyroideus LC
- Yellow-bellied sapsucker, Sphyrapicus varius LC
- Yucatan woodpecker, Melanerpes pygmaeus LC

== Falcons and caracaras ==
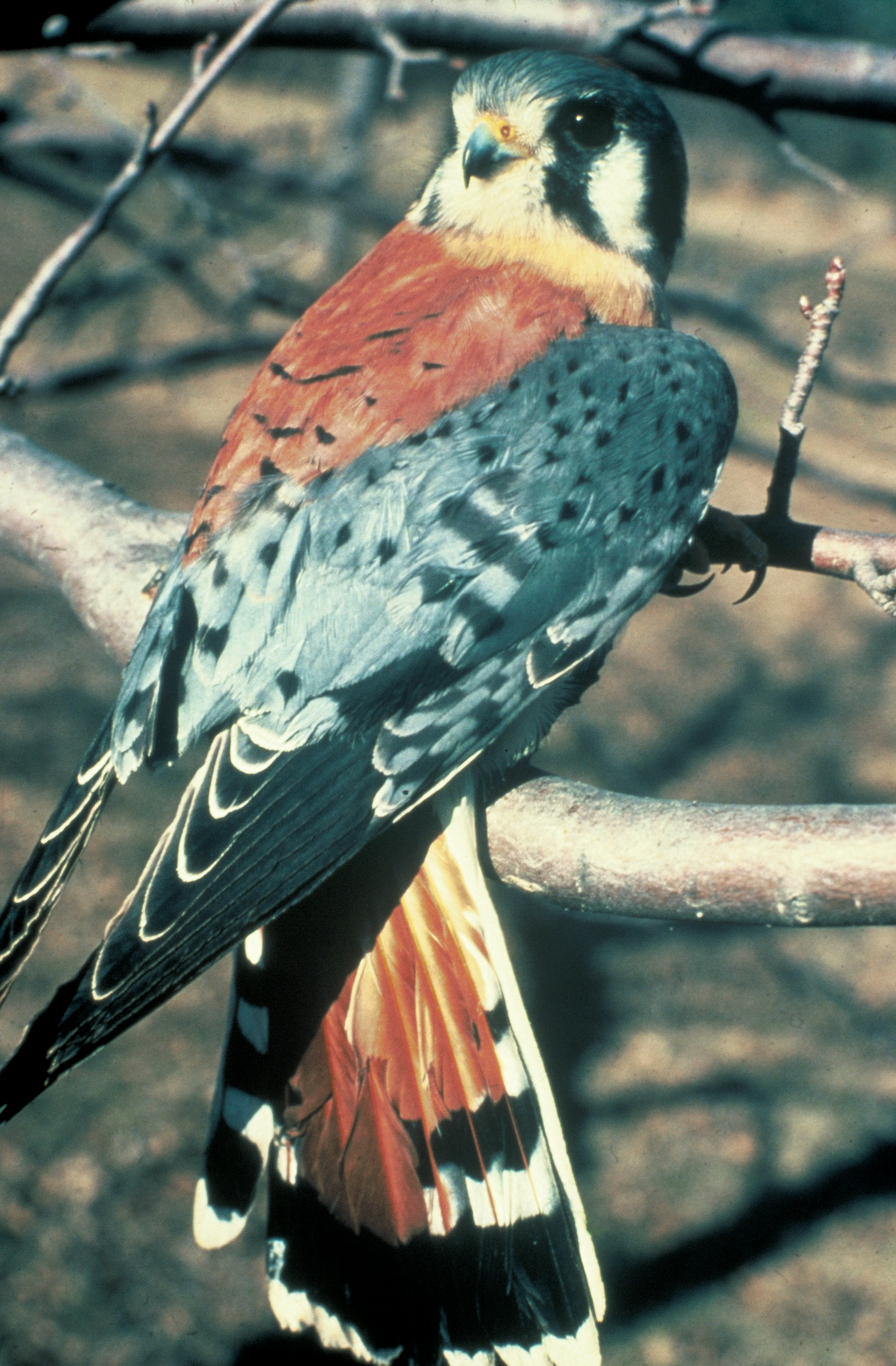
American kestrel

Order: Falconiformes Family: Falconidae

Falconidae is a family of diurnal birds of prey, notably the falcons and caracaras. They differ from hawks, eagles and kites in that they kill with their beaks instead of their talons.

- American kestrel, Falco sparverius LC
- Aplomado falcon, Falco femoralis LC (ssp. septentrionalis: E and XN)
- Barred forest-falcon, Micrastur ruficollis LC
- Bat falcon, Falco rufigularis LC
- Collared forest-falcon, Micrastur semitorquatus LC
- Crested caracara, Caracara plancus LC
- Eurasian hobby, Falco subbuteo (A) LC
- Eurasian kestrel, Falco tinnunculus (C) LC
- Guadalupe caracara, Caracara lutosa (E) EX
- Gyrfalcon, Falco rusticolus LC
- Laughing falcon, Herpetotheres cachinnans LC
- Merlin, Falco columbarius LC
- Orange-breasted falcon, Falco deiroleucus NT
- Peregrine falcon, Falco peregrinus LC (ssp. peregrinus: E)
- Prairie falcon, Falco mexicanus LC
- Red-footed falcon, Falco vespertinus (A) NT
- Red-throated caracara, Ibycter americanus LC
- Slaty-backed forest-falcon, Micrastur mirandollei LC
- Yellow-headed caracara, Milvago chimachima LC

== African and New World parrots ==
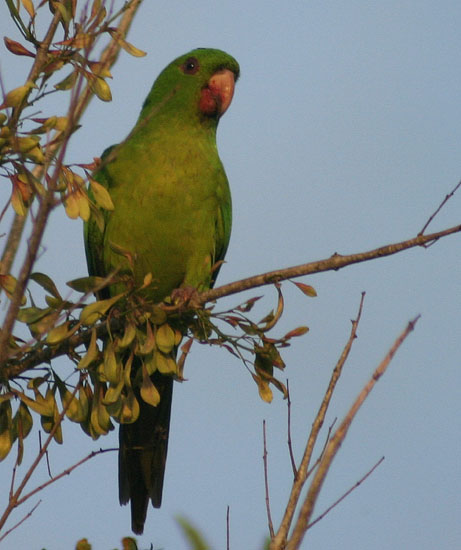
Green parakeet

- Order: Psittaciformes Family: Psittacidae

Parrots are small to large birds with a characteristic curved beak. Their upper mandibles have slight mobility in the joint with the skull and they have a generally erect stance. All parrots are zygodactyl, having the four toes on each foot placed two at the front and two to the back.

- Barred parakeet, Bolborhynchus lineola LC
- Black-billed parrot, Amazona agilis EN
- Blue-and-yellow macaw, Ara ararauna LC
- Blue-fronted parrotlet, Touit dilectissimus LC
- Blue-headed parrot, Pionus menstruus LC
- Brown-hooded parrot, Pyrilia haematotis LC
- Brown-throated parakeet, Eupsittula pertinax LC
- Carolina parakeet, Conuropsis carolinensis (E) EX
- Chestnut-fronted macaw, Ara severus LC
- Crimson-fronted parakeet, Psittacara finschi LC
- Cuban macaw, Ara tricolor (E) EX
- Cuban parakeet, Psittacara euops VU
- Cuban parrot, Amazona leucocephala NT E
- Orange-fronted parakeet, Eupsittula canicularis VU
- Great green macaw, Ara ambiguus CR
- Green parakeet, Psittacara holochlorus LC
- Green-rumped parrotlet, Forpus passerinus LC
- Hispaniolan parakeet, Psittacara chloropterus VU
- Hispaniolan parrot, Amazona ventralis VU
- Imperial parrot, Amazona imperialis CR E
- Lilac-crowned parrot, Amazona finschi EN
- Lilac-tailed parrotlet, Touit batavicus LC
- Maroon-fronted parrot, Rhynchopsitta terrisi EN
- Mealy parrot, Amazona farinosa LC
- Mexican parrotlet, Forpus cyanopygius NT
- Military macaw, Ara militaris VU
- Mitred parakeet, Psittacara mitratus (I) LC
- Monk parakeet, Myiopsitta monachus (I) LC
- Nanday parakeet, Aratinga nenday (I) LC
- Olive-throated parakeet, Eupsittula nana NT
- Orange-chinned parakeet, Brotogeris jugularis LC
- Orange-winged parrot, Amazona amazonica LC
- Pacific parakeet, Psittacara strenuus
- Painted parakeet, Pyrrhura picta LC
- Puerto Rican parakeet, Psittacara maugei (E) EX
- Puerto Rican parrot, Amazona vittata CR E
- Red-and-green macaw, Ara chloropterus LC
- Red-bellied macaw, Orthopsittaca manilatus LC
- Red-crowned parrot, Amazona viridigenalis EN
- Red-fronted parrotlet, Touit costaricensis VU
- Red-lored parrot, Amazona autumnalis LC
- Red-necked parrot, Amazona arausiaca VU E
- Saffron-headed parrot, Pyrilia pyrilia NT
- Scarlet macaw, Ara macao LC
- Scarlet-shouldered parrotlet, Touit huetii VU
- Socorro parakeet, Psittacara brevipes
- Spectacled parrotlet, Forpus conspicillatus LC
- St. Lucia parrot, Amazona versicolor VU E
- St. Vincent parrot, Amazona guildingii VU E
- Sulphur-winged parakeet, Pyrrhura hoffmanni LC
- Thick-billed parrot, Rhynchopsitta pachyrhyncha EN E
- White-crowned parrot, Pionus senilis LC
- White-eyed parakeet, Psittacara leucophthalmus LC
- White-fronted parrot, Amazona albifrons LC
- White-winged parakeet, Brotogeris versicolurus (I) LC
- Yellow-billed parrot, Amazona collaria VU
- Yellow-chevroned parakeet, Brotogeris chiriri (I) LC
- Yellow-crowned parrot, Amazona ochrocephala LC
- Yellow-headed parrot, Amazona oratrix EN
- Yellow-lored parrot, Amazona xantholora LC
- Yellow-naped parrot, Amazona auropalliata EN

== Old World parrots ==
Order: Psittaciformes Family: Psittaculidae

Characteristic features of parrots include a strong curved bill, an upright stance, strong legs, and clawed zygodactyl feet. Many parrots are vividly colored, and some are multi-colored. In size they range from 8 cm (3.1 in) to 1 m (3.3 ft) in length. Old World parrots are found from Africa east across south and southeast Asia and Oceania to Australia and New Zealand.

- Rose-ringed parakeet, Psittacula krameri (I) LC
- Rosy-faced lovebird, Agapornis roseicollis (I) LC

== Sapayoa ==
Order: Passeriformes Family: Sapayoidae

The sapayoa is the only member of its family, and is found in the lowland rainforests of Panama and north-western South America. It is usually seen in pairs or mixed-species flocks.

- Sapayoa, Sapayoa aenigma LC

== Typical antbirds ==
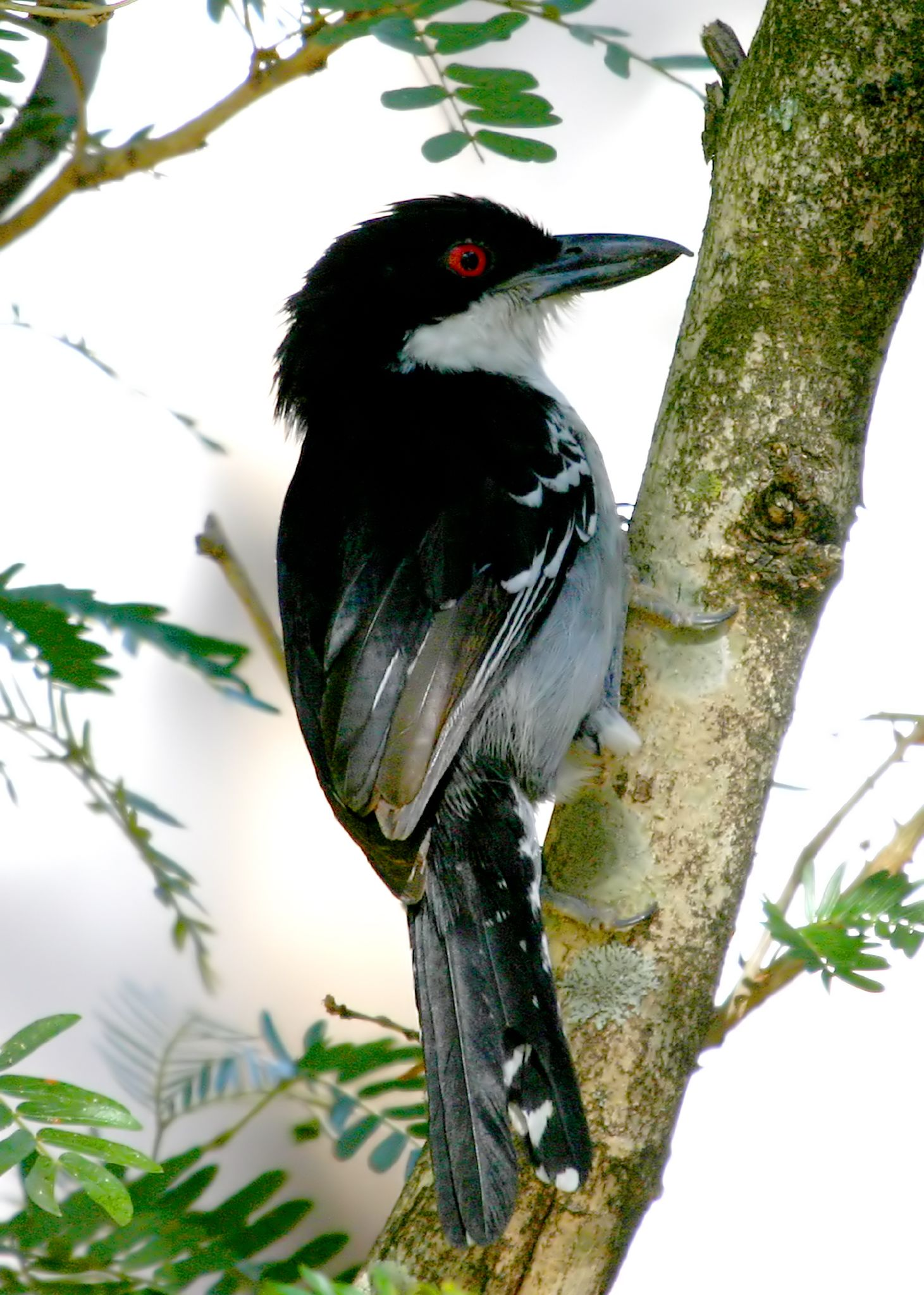
Great antshrike

Order: Passeriformes Family: Thamnophilidae

The antbirds are a large family of small passerine birds of subtropical and tropical Central and South America. They are forest birds which tend to feed on insects at or near the ground. A sizable minority of them specialize in following columns of army ants to eat small invertebrates that leave their hiding places to flee from the ants. Many species lack bright color, with brown, black, and white being the dominant tones.

- Bare-crowned antbird, Gymnocichla nudiceps LC
- Barred antshrike, Thamnophilus doliatus LC
- Bicolored antbird, Gymnopithys leucaspis LC
- Black antshrike, Thamnophilus nigriceps LC
- Black-crested antshrike, Sakesphorus canadensis LC
- Black-crowned antshrike, Thamnophilus atrinucha LC
- Black-hooded antshrike, Thamnophilus bridgesi LC
- Checker-throated stipplethroat, Epinecrophylla fulviventris LC
- Chestnut-backed antbird, Poliocrania exsul LC
- Dot-winged antwren, Microrhopias quixensis LC
- Dull-mantled antbird, Sipia laemosticta LC
- Dusky antbird, Cercomacroides tyrannina LC
- Fasciated antshrike, Cymbilaimus lineatus LC
- Great antshrike, Taraba major LC
- Jet antbird, Cercomacra nigricans LC
- Moustached antwren, Myrmotherula ignota LC
- Ocellated antbird, Phaenostictus mcleannani LC
- Pacific antwren, Myrmotherula pacifica LC
- Plain antvireo, Dysithamnus mentalis LC
- Rufous-rumped antwren, Euchrepomis callinota LC
- Rufous-winged antwren, Herpsilochmus rufimarginatus LC
- Russet antshrike, Thamnistes anabatinus LC
- Rusty-winged antwren, Herpsilochmus frater (A)
- Slaty antwren, Myrmotherula schisticolor LC
- Spiny-faced antshrike, Xenornis setifrons NT
- Spot-crowned antvireo, Dysithamnus puncticeps LC
- Spotted antbird, Hylophylax naevioides LC
- Streak-crowned antvireo, Dysithamnus striaticeps LC
- White-bellied antbird, Myrmeciza longipes LC
- White-flanked antwren, Myrmotherula axillaris LC
- White-fringed antwren, Formicivora grisea LC
- Wing-banded antbird, Myrmornis torquata LC
- Zeledon's antbird, Hafferia zeledoni LC

== Gnateaters ==
Order: Passeriformes Family: Conopophagidae

The members of this small family are found across northern South America and into Central America. They are forest birds, usually seen on the ground or in the low understory.

- Black-crowned antpitta, Pittasoma michleri LC

== Antpittas ==
Order: Passeriformes Family: Grallariidae

Antpittas resemble the true pittas with strong, longish legs, very short tails, and stout bills.

- Ochre-breasted antpitta, Grallaricula flavirostris NT
- Scaled antpitta, Grallaria guatimalensis LC
- Streak-chested antpitta, Hylopezus perspicillatus LC
- Thicket antpitta, Hylopezus dives LC

== Tapaculos ==
Order: Passeriformes Family: Rhinocryptidae

The tapaculos are small suboscine passeriform birds with numerous species in South and Central America. They are terrestrial species that fly only poorly on their short wings. They have strong legs, well-suited to their habitat of grassland or forest undergrowth. The tail is cocked and pointed towards the head.

- Choco tapaculo, Scytalopus chocoensis LC
- Silvery-fronted tapaculo, Scytalopus argentifrons LC
- Tacarcuna tapaculo, Scytalopus panamensis VU

== Antthrushes ==
Order: Passeriformes Family: Formicariidae

Antthrushes resemble small rails with strong, longish legs, very short tails, and stout bills.

- Black-faced antthrush, Formicarius analis LC
- Black-headed antthrush, Formicarius nigricapillus LC
- Mayan antthrush, Formicarius moniliger LC
- Rufous-breasted antthrush, Formicarius rufipectus LC

== Ovenbirds and woodcreepers ==
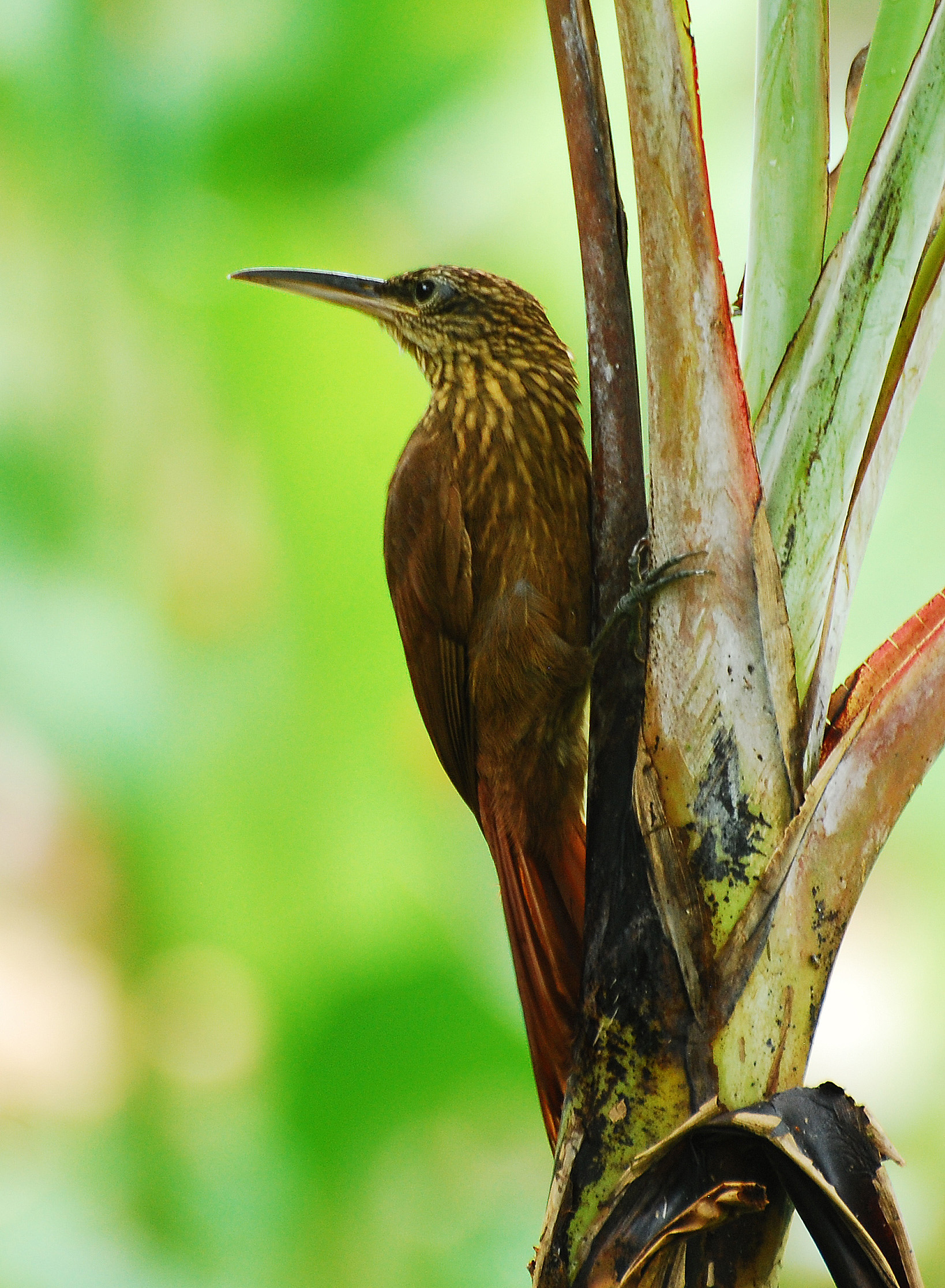
Cocoa woodcreeper

Order: Passeriformes Family: Furnariidae

Ovenbirds comprise a large family of small sub-oscine passerine bird species found in Central and South America. They are a diverse group of insectivores which gets its name from the elaborate "oven-like" clay nests built by some species, although others build stick nests or nest in tunnels or clefts in rock. The woodcreepers are brownish birds which maintain an upright vertical posture supported by their stiff tail vanes. They feed mainly on insects taken from tree trunks.

- Beautiful treerunner, Margarornis bellulus NT
- Black-banded woodcreeper, Dendrocolaptes picumnus LC
- Black-striped woodcreeper, Xiphorhynchus lachrymosus LC
- Brown-billed scythebill, Campylorhamphus pusillus LC
- Buff-fronted foliage-gleaner, Dendroma rufa LC
- Buff-throated foliage-gleaner, Automolus ochrolaemus LC
- Buffy tuftedcheek, Pseudocolaptes lawrencii LC
- Chiriqui foliage-gleaner, Automolus exsertus
- Cocoa woodcreeper, Xiphorhynchus susurrans LC
- Coiba spinetail, Cranioleuca dissita LC
- Double-banded graytail, Xenerpestes minlosi LC
- Gray-throated leaftosser, Sclerurus albigularis NT
- Ivory-billed woodcreeper, Xiphorhynchus flavigaster LC
- Lineated foliage-gleaner, Syndactyla subalaris LC
- Long-tailed woodcreeper, Deconychura longicauda LC
- Northern barred-woodcreeper, Dendrocolaptes sanctithomae LC
- Olivaceous woodcreeper, Sittasomus griseicapillus LC
- Pale-breasted spinetail, Synallaxis albescens LC
- Plain xenops, Xenops minutus LC
- Plain-brown woodcreeper, Dendrocincla fuliginosa LC
- Red-billed scythebill, Campylorhamphus trochilirostris LC
- Red-faced spinetail, Cranioleuca erythrops LC
- Ruddy foliage-gleaner, Clibanornis rubiginosus LC
- Ruddy treerunner, Margarornis rubiginosus LC
- Ruddy woodcreeper, Dendrocincla homochroa LC
- Rufous-breasted spinetail, Synallaxis erythrothorax LC
- Scaly-throated foliage-gleaner, Anabacerthia variegaticeps LC
- Scaly-throated leaftosser, Sclerurus guatemalensis LC
- Sharp-tailed streamcreeper, Lochmias nematura LC
- Slaty spinetail, Synallaxis brachyura LC
- Slaty-winged foliage-gleaner, Philydor fuscipenne LC
- Spot-crowned woodcreeper, Lepidocolaptes affinis LC
- Spotted barbtail, Premnoplex brunnescens LC
- Spotted woodcreeper, Xiphorhynchus erythropygius LC
- Straight-billed woodcreeper, Dendroplex picus LC
- Streak-breasted treehunter, Thripadectes rufobrunneus LC
- Streaked xenops, Xenops rutilans LC
- Streak-headed woodcreeper, Lepidocolaptes souleyetii LC
- Striped woodhaunter, Automolus subulatus LC
- Strong-billed woodcreeper, Xiphocolaptes promeropirhynchus LC
- Tawny-throated leaftosser, Sclerurus mexicanus LC
- Tawny-winged woodcreeper, Dendrocincla anabatina LC
- Wedge-billed woodcreeper, Glyphorynchus spirurus LC
- White-striped woodcreeper, Lepidocolaptes leucogaster LC

== Manakins ==
Order: Passeriformes Family: Pipridae

The manakins are a family of subtropical and tropical mainland Central and South America, and Trinidad and Tobago. They are compact forest birds, the males typically being brightly colored, although the females of most species are duller and usually green-plumaged. Manakins feed on small fruits, berries, and insects.

- Golden-collared manakin, Manacus vitellinus LC
- Golden-headed manakin, Ceratopipra erythrocephala LC
- Green manakin, Cryptopipo holochlora LC
- Lance-tailed manakin, Chiroxiphia lanceolata LC
- Long-tailed manakin, Chiroxiphia linearis LC
- Orange-collared manakin, Manacus aurantiacus LC
- Red-capped manakin, Ceratopipra mentalis LC
- Blue-crowned manakin, Lepidothrix coronata LC
- White-collared manakin, Manacus candei LC
- White-crowned manakin, Pseudopipra pipra LC
- White-ruffed manakin, Corapipo altera LC

== Cotingas ==
Order: Passeriformes Family: Cotingidae

The cotingas are birds of forests or forest edges in tropical Central and South America. Comparatively little is known about this diverse group, although all have broad bills with hooked tips, rounded wings, and strong legs. The males of many of the species are brightly colored or decorated with plumes or wattles.

- Bare-necked umbrellabird, Cephalopterus glabricollis EN
- Bearded bellbird, Procnias averano LC
- Black-tipped cotinga, Carpodectes hopkei LC
- Blue cotinga, Cotinga nattererii LC
- Lovely cotinga, Cotinga amabilis LC
- Purple-throated fruitcrow, Querula purpurata LC
- Rufous piha, Lipaugus unirufus LC
- Snowy cotinga, Carpodectes nitidus LC
- Three-wattled bellbird, Procnias tricarunculatus VU
- Turquoise cotinga, Cotinga ridgwayi VU
- White bellbird, Procnias albus LC
- Yellow-billed cotinga, Carpodectes antoniae EN

== Tityras and allies ==
Order: Passeriformes Family: Tityridae

Tityridae are suboscine passerine birds found in forest and woodland in the Neotropics. The species in this family were formerly spread over the families Tyrannidae, Pipridae, and Cotingidae. They are small to medium-sized birds. They do not have the sophisticated vocal capabilities of the songbirds. Most, but not all, have plain coloring.

- Barred becard, Pachyramphus versicolor LC
- Black-and-white becard, Pachyramphus albogriseus LC
- Black-crowned tityra, Tityra inquisitor LC
- Black-tailed tityra, Tityra cayana LC
- Cinereous becard, Pachyramphus rufus LC
- Cinnamon becard, Pachyramphus cinnamomeus LC
- Gray-collared becard, Pachyramphus major LC
- Jamaican becard, Pachyramphus niger LC
- Masked tityra, Tityra semifasciata LC
- Northern schiffornis, Schiffornis veraepacis LC
- One-colored becard, Pachyramphus homochrous LC
- Rose-throated becard, Pachyramphus aglaiae LC
- Russet-winged schiffornis, Schiffornis stenorhyncha LC
- Speckled mourner, Laniocera rufescens LC
- White-winged becard, Pachyramphus polychopterus LC

== Sharpbill ==
Order: Passeriformes Family: Oxyruncidae

The sharpbill is a small bird of dense forests in Central and South America. It feeds mostly on fruit but also eats insects.

- Sharpbill, Oxyruncus cristatus LC

== Royal flycatcher and allies ==
Order: Passeriformes Family: Onychorhynchidae

The members of this small family, created in 2018, were formerly considered to be tyrant flycatchers, family Tyrannidae.

- Black-tailed flycatcher, Myiobius atricaudus LC
- Royal flycatcher, Onychorhynchus coronatus LC
- Ruddy-tailed flycatcher, Terenotriccus erythrurus LC
- Sulphur-rumped flycatcher, Myiobius sulphureipygius LC
- Tawny-breasted flycatcher, Myiobius villosus LC

== Tyrant flycatchers ==
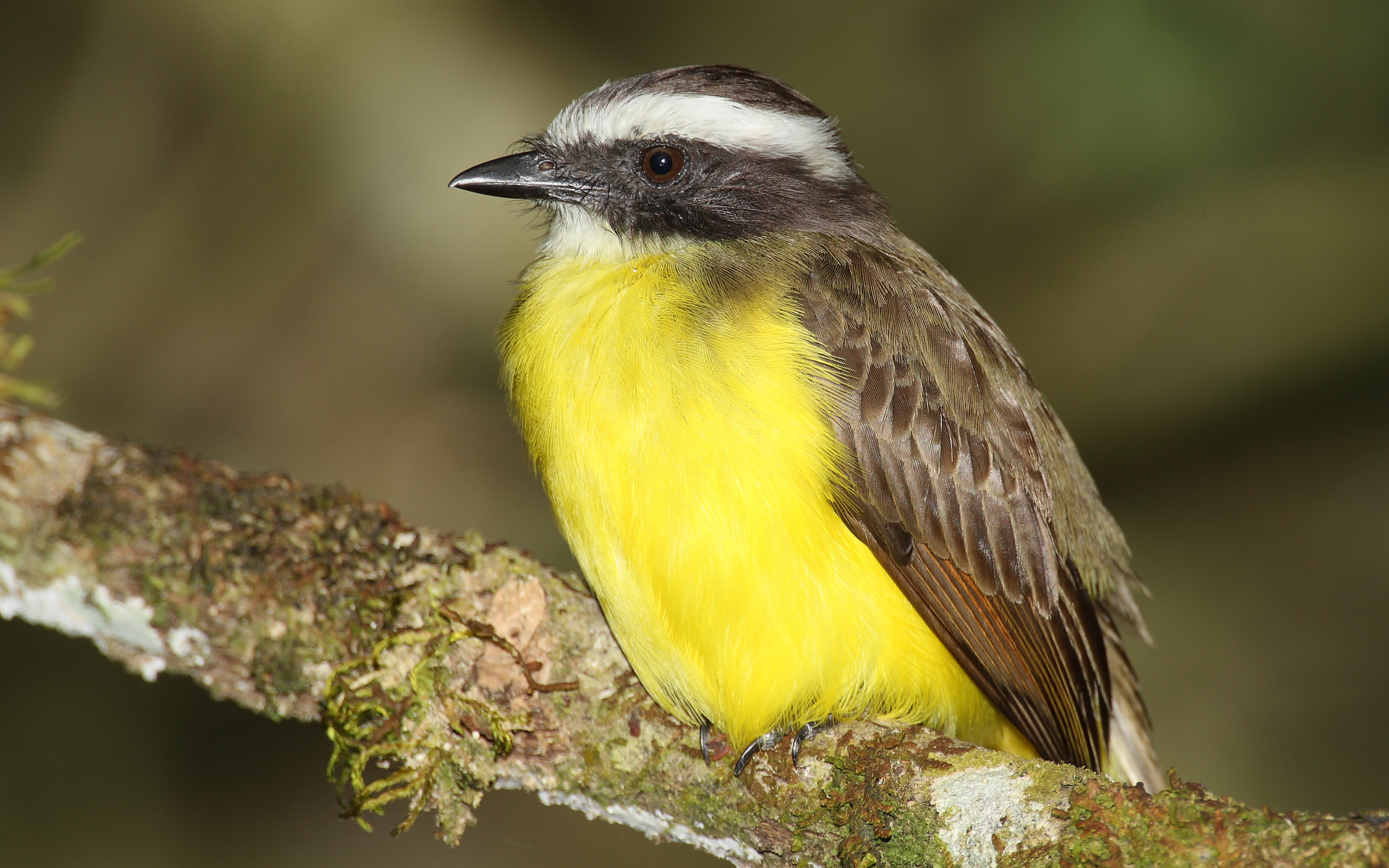
Great kiskadee

Order: Passeriformes Family: Tyrannidae

Tyrant flycatchers are Passerine birds which occur throughout North and South America. They superficially resemble the Old World flycatchers, but are more robust and have stronger bills. They do not have the sophisticated vocal capabilities of the songbirds. Most, but not all, are rather plain. As the name implies, most are insectivorous.

- Acadian flycatcher, Empidonax virescens LC
- Alder flycatcher, Empidonax alnorum LC
- Dusky flycatcher, Empidonax oberholseri LC
- Gray flycatcher, Empidonax wrightii LC
- Ash-throated flycatcher, Myiarchus cinerascens LC
- Belted flycatcher, Xenotriccus callizonus LC
- Black phoebe, Sayornis nigricans LC
- Black-billed flycatcher, Aphanotriccus audax NT
- Black-capped flycatcher, Empidonax atriceps LC
- Black-capped pygmy-tyrant, Myiornis atricapillus LC
- Black-headed tody-flycatcher, Todirostrum nigriceps LC
- Blue Mountain elaenia, Elaenia fallax LC
- Boat-billed flycatcher, Megarynchus pitangua LC
- Bran-colored flycatcher, Myiophobus fasciatus LC
- Bright-rumped attila, Attila spadiceus LC
- Bronze-olive pygmy-tyrant, Pseudotriccus pelzelni LC
- Brown-capped tyrannulet, Ornithion brunneicapillus LC
- Brown-crested flycatcher, Myiarchus tyrannulus LC
- Brownish twistwing, Cnipodectes subbrunneus LC
- Buff-breasted flycatcher, Empidonax fulvifrons LC
- Caribbean elaenia, Elaenia martinica LC
- Cassin's kingbird, Tyrannus vociferans LC
- Cattle tyrant, Machetornis rixosa LC
- Choco sirystes, Sirystes albogriseus LC
- Cocos flycatcher, Nesotriccus ridgwayi VU
- Common tody-flycatcher, Todirostrum cinereum LC
- Couch's kingbird, Tyrannus couchii LC
- Crowned slaty flycatcher, Empidonomus aurantioatrocristatus (A) LC
- Cuban pewee, Contopus caribaeus LC
- Dark pewee, Contopus lugubris LC
- Dusky-capped flycatcher, Myiarchus tuberculifer LC
- Eastern kingbird, Tyrannus tyrannus LC
- Eastern phoebe, Sayornis phoebe LC
- Eastern wood-pewee, Contopus virens LC
- Euler's flycatcher, Lathrotriccus euleri LC (ssp. johnstonei: E)
- Eye-ringed flatbill, Rhynchocyclus brevirostris LC
- Flammulated flycatcher, Ramphotrigon flammulatum LC
- Forest elaenia, Myiopagis gaimardii LC
- Fork-tailed flycatcher, Tyrannus savana LC
- Giant kingbird, Tyrannus cubensis EN
- Golden-bellied flycatcher, Myiodynastes hemichrysus LC
- Golden-crowned flycatcher, Myiodynastes chrysocephalus LC
- Golden-crowned spadebill, Platyrinchus coronatus LC
- Great crested flycatcher, Myiarchus crinitus LC
- Great kiskadee, Pitangus sulphuratus LC
- Greater pewee, Contopus pertinax LC
- Greenish elaenia, Myiopagis viridicata LC
- Grenada flycatcher, Myiarchus nugator LC
- Gray elaenia, Myiopagis caniceps LC
- Gray kingbird, Tyrannus dominicensis LC
- Gray-capped flycatcher, Myiozetetes granadensis LC
- Gray-headed piprites, Piprites griseiceps LC
- Guatemalan tyrannulet, Zimmerius vilissimus LC
- Hammond's flycatcher, Empidonax hammondii LC
- Hispaniolan elaenia, Elaenia cherriei
- Hispaniolan pewee, Contopus hispaniolensis LC
- Jamaican elaenia, Myiopagis cotta LC
- Jamaican pewee, Contopus pallidus LC
- La Sagra's flycatcher, Myiarchus sagrae LC
- Least flycatcher, Empidonax minimus LC
- Lesser Antillean flycatcher, Myiarchus oberi LC
- Lesser Antillean pewee, Contopus latirostris LC
- Lesser elaenia, Elaenia chiriquensis LC
- Lesser kiskadee, Philohydor lictor LC
- Loggerhead kingbird, Tyrannus caudifasciatus LC
- Long-tailed tyrant, Colonia colonus LC
- Mistletoe tyrannulet, Zimmerius parvus LC
- Mountain elaenia, Elaenia frantzii LC
- Mouse-colored tyrannulet, Nesotriccus murinus LC
- Northern beardless-tyrannulet, Camptostoma imberbe LC
- Northern bentbill, Oncostoma cinereigulare LC
- Northern scrub-flycatcher, Sublegatus arenarum LC
- Nutting's flycatcher, Myiarchus nuttingi LC
- Ochraceous pewee, Contopus ochraceus LC
- Ochre-bellied flycatcher, Mionectes oleagineus LC
- Olivaceous flatbill, Rhynchocyclus olivaceus LC
- Olive-sided flycatcher, Contopus cooperi NT
- Olive-striped flycatcher, Mionectes olivaceus LC
- Pale-eyed pygmy-tyrant, Lophotriccus pilaris LC
- Panama flycatcher, Myiarchus panamensis LC
- Pied water-tyrant, Fluvicola pica LC
- Pileated flycatcher, Xenotriccus mexicanus LC
- Pine flycatcher, Empidonax affinis LC
- Piratic flycatcher, Legatus leucophaius LC
- Puerto Rican flycatcher, Myiarchus antillarum LC
- Rufous mourner, Rhytipterna holerythra LC
- Rufous-browed tyrannulet, Phylloscartes superciliaris LC
- Rufous-tailed flycatcher, Myiarchus validus LC
- Rusty-margined flycatcher, Myiozetetes cayanensis LC
- Sad flycatcher, Myiarchus barbirostris LC
- Say's phoebe, Sayornis saya LC
- Scale-crested pygmy-tyrant, Lophotriccus pileatus LC
- Scissor-tailed flycatcher, Tyrannus forficatus LC
- Sepia-capped flycatcher, Leptopogon amaurocephalus LC
- Slate-headed tody-flycatcher, Poecilotriccus sylvia LC
- Slaty-capped flycatcher, Leptopogon superciliaris LC
- Small-billed elaenia, Elaenia parvirostris LC
- Social flycatcher, Myiozetetes similis LC
- Sooty-headed tyrannulet, Phyllomyias griseiceps LC
- Southern beardless-tyrannulet, Camptostoma obsoletum LC
- Southern bentbill, Oncostoma olivaceum LC
- Stolid flycatcher, Myiarchus stolidus LC
- Streaked flycatcher, Myiodynastes maculatus LC
- Stub-tailed spadebill, Platyrinchus cancrominus LC
- Sulphur-bellied flycatcher, Myiodynastes luteiventris LC
- Tawny-chested flycatcher, Aphanotriccus capitalis VU
- Thick-billed kingbird, Tyrannus crassirostris LC
- Torrent tyrannulet, Serpophaga cinerea LC
- Tropical kingbird, Tyrannus melancholicus LC
- Tropical pewee, Contopus cinereus LC
- Tufted flycatcher, Mitrephanes phaeocercus LC
- Variegated flycatcher, Empidonomus varius (A) LC
- Vermilion flycatcher, Pyrocephalus rubinus LC
- Western flycatcher, Empidonax difficilis LC
- Western kingbird, Tyrannus verticalis LC
- Western wood-pewee, Contopus sordidulus LC
- White-crested elaenia, Elaenia albiceps (A) LC
- Rough-legged tyrannulet, Phyllomyias burmeisteri LC
- White-ringed flycatcher, Conopias albovittatus LC
- White-throated flycatcher, Empidonax albigularis LC
- White-throated spadebill, Platyrinchus mystaceus LC
- Willow flycatcher, Empidonax traillii LC (ssp. extimus: E)
- Yellow tyrannulet, Capsiempis flaveola LC
- Yellow-bellied elaenia, Elaenia flavogaster LC
- Yellow-bellied flycatcher, Empidonax flaviventris LC
- Yellow-bellied tyrannulet, Ornithion semiflavum LC
- Yellow-breasted flycatcher, Tolmomyias flaviventris LC
- Yellow-crowned tyrannulet, Tyrannulus elatus LC
- Yellow-green tyrannulet, Phylloscartes flavovirens LC
- Yellowish flycatcher, Empidonax flavescens LC
- Yellow-margined flycatcher, Tolmomyias assimilis LC
- Yellow-olive flycatcher, Tolmomyias sulphurescens LC
- Yucatan flycatcher, Myiarchus yucatanensis LC

== Shrikes ==
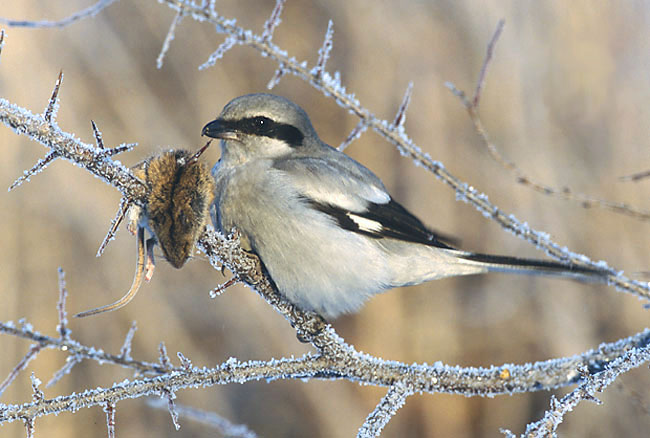
Northern shrike

Order: Passeriformes Family: Laniidae

Shrikes are passerine birds known for their habit of catching other birds and small animals and impaling the uneaten portions of their bodies on thorns. A shrike's beak is hooked, like that of a typical bird of prey.

- Brown shrike, Lanius cristatus (A) LC
- Loggerhead shrike, Lanius ludovicianus NT (ssp. mearnsi: E)
- Northern shrike, Lanius excubitor LC
- Red-backed shrike, Lanius collurio (A) LC

== Vireos, shrike-babblers, and erpornis ==
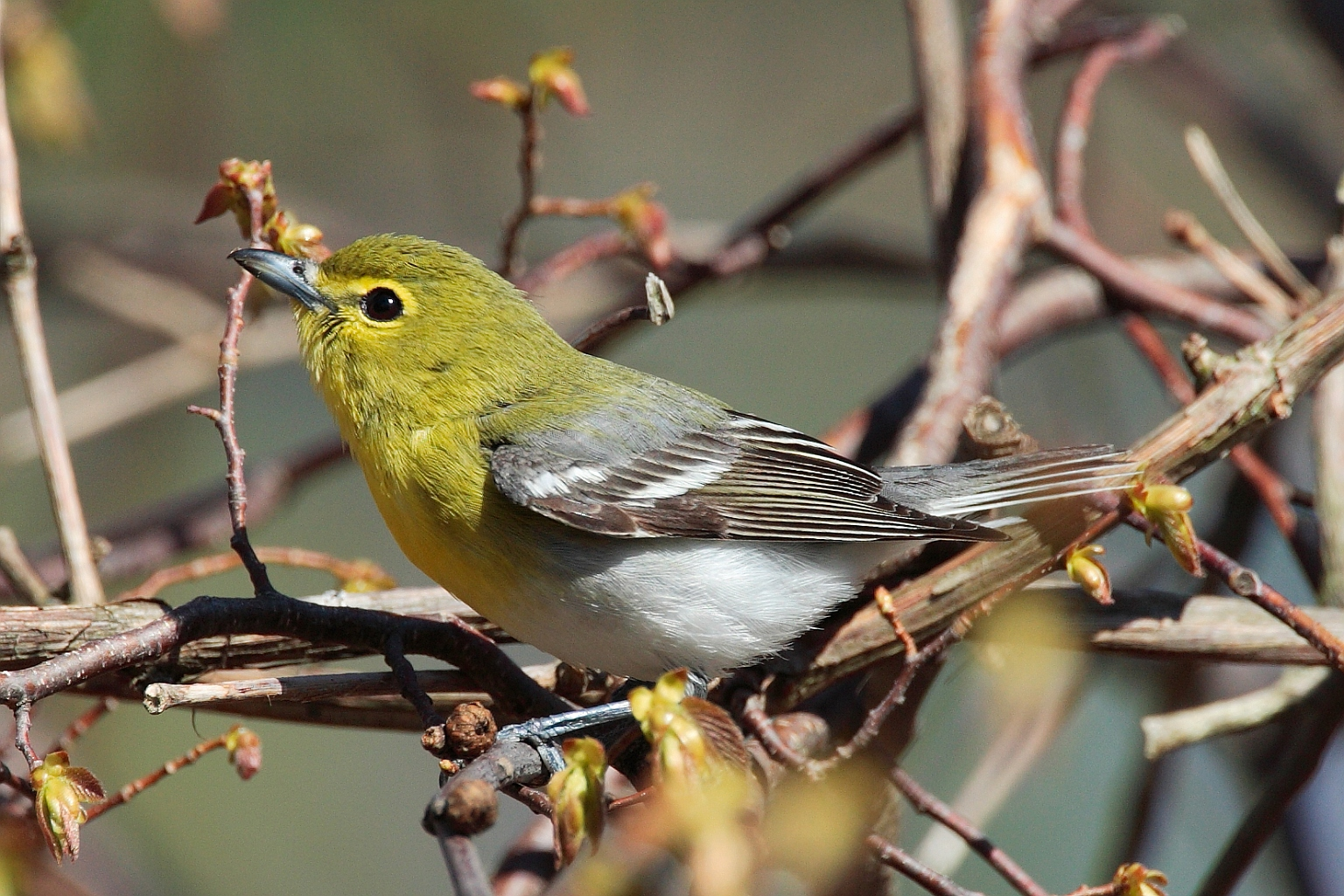
Yellow-throated vireo

Order: Passeriformes Family: Vireonidae

The vireos are a group of small to medium-sized passerine birds. They are typically greenish in color and resemble wood warblers apart from their heavier bills.

- Bell's vireo, Vireo bellii LC (Least Bell's vireo V. b. pusillus: E)
- Black-capped vireo, Vireo atricapilla NT E
- Black-whiskered vireo, Vireo altiloquus LC
- Blue Mountain vireo, Vireo osburni NT
- Blue-headed vireo, Vireo solitarius LC
- Brown-capped vireo, Vireo leucophrys LC
- Cassin's vireo, Vireo cassinii LC
- Chestnut-sided shrike-vireo, Vireolanius melitophrys LC
- Cozumel vireo, Vireo bairdi NT
- Cuban vireo, Vireo gundlachii LC
- Dwarf vireo, Vireo nelsoni LC
- Flat-billed vireo, Vireo nanus LC
- Golden vireo, Vireo hypochryseus LC
- Golden-fronted greenlet, Pachysylvia aurantiifrons LC
- Gray vireo, Vireo vicinior LC
- Green shrike-vireo, Vireolanius pulchellus LC
- Hutton's vireo, Vireo huttoni LC
- Jamaican vireo, Vireo modestus LC
- Lesser greenlet, Pachysylvia decurtata LC
- Mangrove vireo, Vireo pallens LC
- Philadelphia vireo, Vireo philadelphicus LC
- Plumbeous vireo, Vireo plumbeus LC
- Puerto Rican vireo, Vireo latimeri LC
- Red-eyed vireo, Vireo olivaceus LC
- Rufous-browed peppershrike, Cyclarhis gujanensis LC
- San Andres vireo, Vireo caribaeus VU
- Scrub greenlet, Hylophilus flavipes LC
- Slaty vireo, Vireo brevipennis LC
- Tawny-crowned greenlet, Tunchiornis ochraceiceps LC
- Thick-billed vireo, Vireo crassirostris LC
- Warbling vireo, Vireo gilvus LC
- White-eyed vireo, Vireo griseus LC
- Yellow-browed shrike-vireo, Vireolanius eximius LC
- Yellow-green vireo, Vireo flavoviridis LC
- Yellow-throated vireo, Vireo flavifrons LC
- Yellow-winged vireo, Vireo carmioli LC
- Yucatan vireo, Vireo magister LC

== Crows, jays, and magpies ==
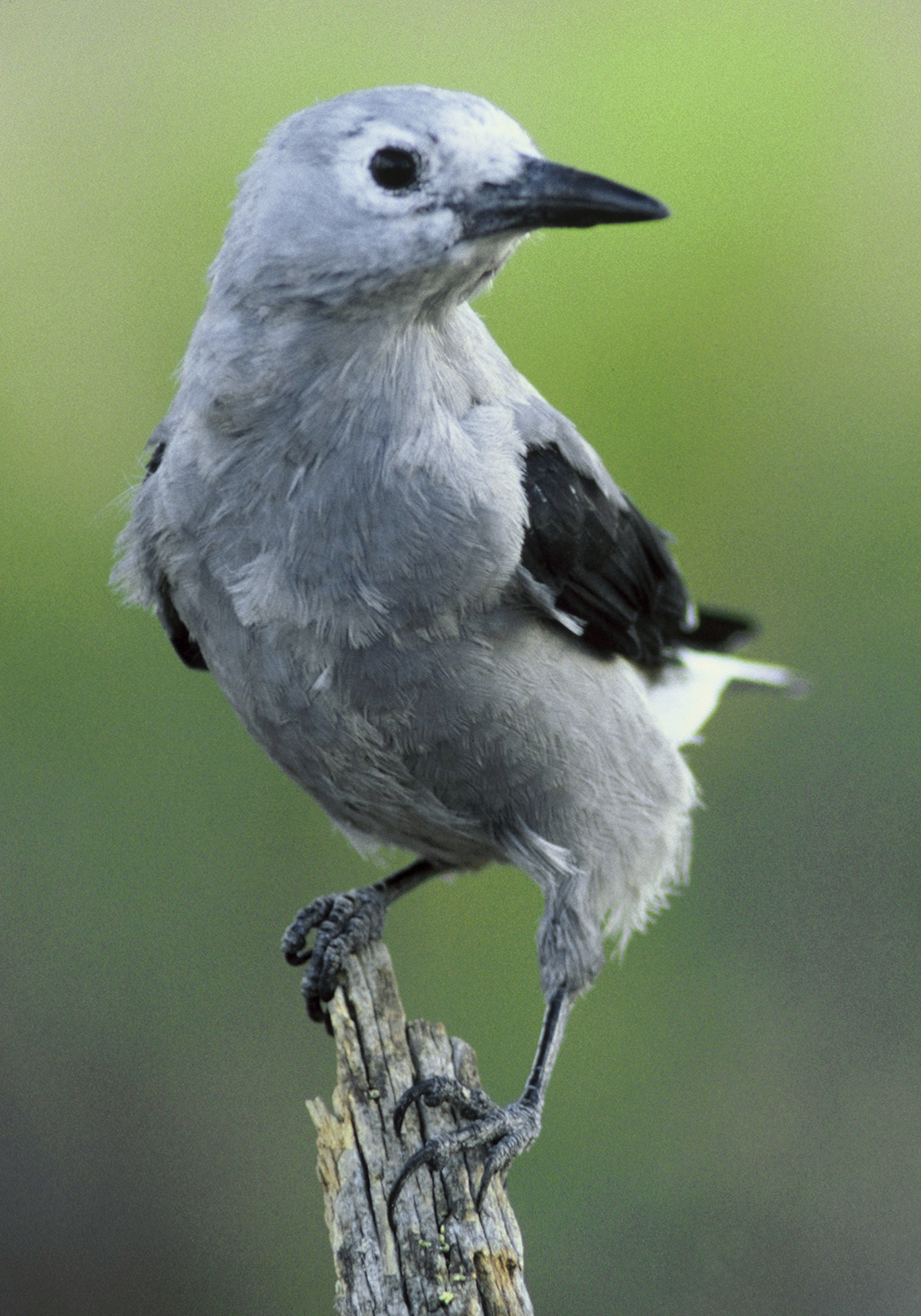
Clark's nutcracker

Order: Passeriformes Family: Corvidae

The family Corvidae includes crows, ravens, jays, choughs, magpies, treepies, nutcrackers and ground jays. Corvids are above average in size among the Passeriformes, and some of the larger species show high levels of intelligence.

- American crow, Corvus brachyrhynchos LC
- Azure-hooded jay, Cyanolyca cucullata LC
- Black-billed magpie, Pica hudsonia LC
- Black-chested jay, Cyanocorax affinis LC
- Black-throated jay, Cyanolyca pumilo LC
- Black-throated magpie-jay, Calocitta colliei LC
- Blue jay, Cyanocitta cristata LC
- Brown jay, Psilorhinus morio LC
- Bushy-crested jay, Cyanocorax melanocyaneus LC
- California scrub-jay, Aphelocoma californica LC
- Canada jay, Perisoreus canadensis LC
- Chihuahuan raven, Corvus cryptoleucus LC
- Clark's nutcracker, Nucifraga columbiana LC
- Common raven, Corvus corax LC
- Cuban crow, Corvus nasicus LC
- Dwarf jay, Cyanolyca nana NT
- Eurasian jackdaw, Corvus monedula (A) LC
- Fish crow, Corvus ossifragus LC
- Florida scrub-jay, Aphelocoma coerulescens VU T
- Green jay, Cyanocorax yncas LC
- Hooded crow, Corvus cornix (A)
- House crow, Corvus splendens (A) LC
- Island scrub-jay, Aphelocoma insularis VU
- Jamaican crow, Corvus jamaicensis NT
- Mexican jay, Aphelocoma wollweberi LC
- Palm crow, Corvus palmarum LC
- Pinyon jay, Gymnorhinus cyanocephalus VU
- Purplish-backed jay, Cyanocorax beecheii LC
- Rook, Corvus frugilegus (A) LC
- San Blas jay, Cyanocorax sanblasianus LC
- Silvery-throated jay, Cyanolyca argentigula LC
- Sinaloa crow, Corvus sinaloae LC
- Steller's jay, Cyanocitta stelleri LC
- Tamaulipas crow, Corvus imparatus LC
- Transvolcanic jay, Aphelocoma ultramarina LC
- Tufted jay, Cyanocorax dickeyi NT
- Unicolored jay, Aphelocoma unicolor LC
- White-necked crow, Corvus leucognaphalus VU E
- White-throated jay, Cyanolyca mirabilis VU
- White-throated magpie-jay, Calocitta formosa LC
- Woodhouse's scrub-jay, Aphelocoma woodhouseii
- Yellow-billed magpie, Pica nuttalli VU
- Yucatan jay, Cyanocorax yucatanicus LC

== Larks ==
Order: Passeriformes Family: Alaudidae

Larks are small terrestrial birds with often extravagant songs and display flights. Most larks are fairly dull in appearance. Their food is insects and seeds.

- Eurasian skylark, Alauda arvensis LC
- Horned lark, Eremophila alpestris LC (E. a. strigata T)

== Swallows ==
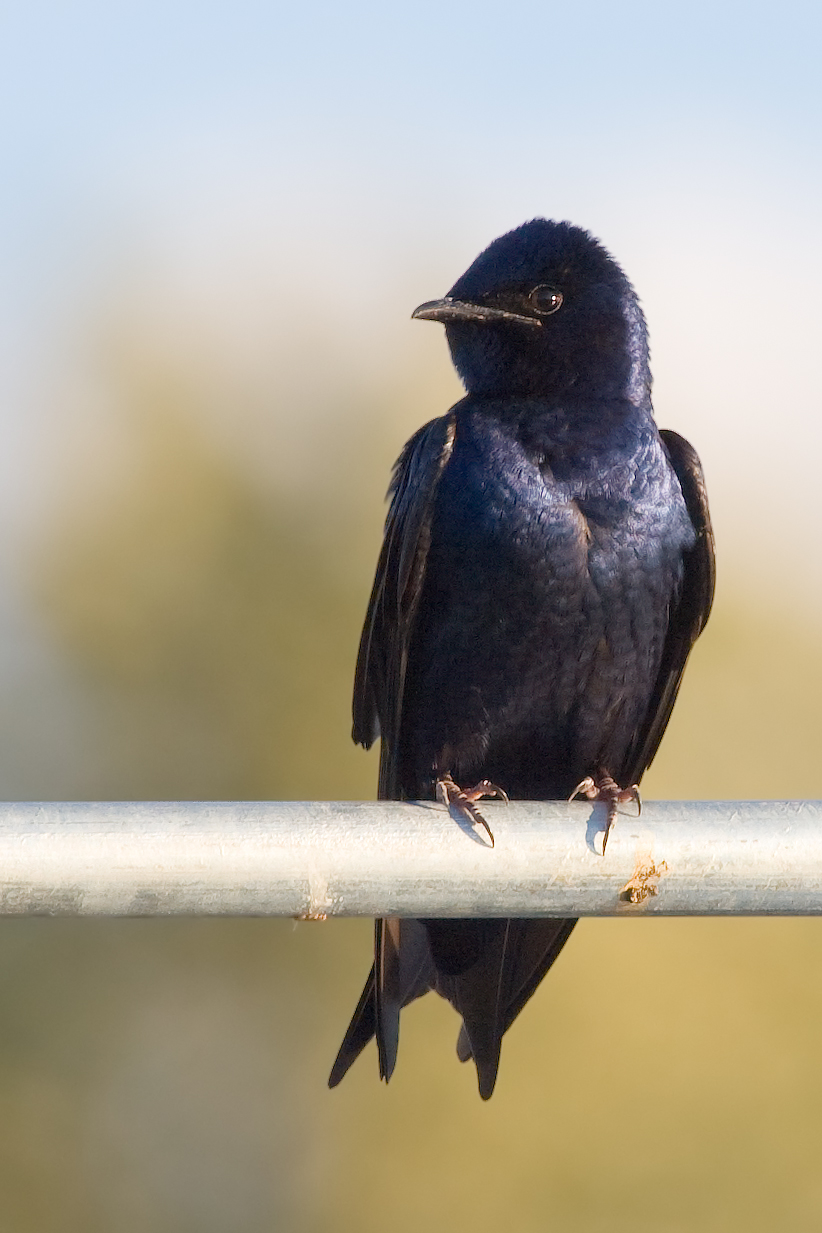
Purple martin

Order: Passeriformes Family: Hirundinidae

The family Hirundinidae is adapted to aerial feeding. They have a slender streamlined body, long pointed wings and a short bill with a wide gape. The feet are adapted to perching rather than walking, and the front toes are partially joined at the base.

- Cliff swallow, Petrochelidon pyrrhonota LC
- Bahama swallow, Tachycineta cyaneoviridis EN
- Bank swallow, Riparia riparia LC
- Barn swallow, Hirundo rustica LC
- Black-capped swallow, Atticora pileata LC
- Blue-and-white swallow, Pygochelidon cyanoleuca LC
- Brown-chested martin, Progne tapera LC
- Caribbean martin, Progne dominicensis LC
- Cave swallow, Petrochelidon fulva LC
- Common house-martin, Delichon urbicum (A) LC
- Cuban martin, Progne cryptoleuca LC
- Golden swallow, Tachycineta euchrysea VU
- Gray-breasted martin, Progne chalybea LC
- Mangrove swallow, Tachycineta albilinea LC
- Northern rough-winged swallow, Stelgidopteryx serripennis LC
- Purple martin, Progne subis LC
- Sinaloa martin, Progne sinaloae VU
- Southern martin, Progne elegans LC
- Southern rough-winged swallow, Stelgidopteryx ruficollis LC
- Tree swallow, Tachycineta bicolor LC
- Violet-green swallow, Tachycineta thalassina LC
- White-thighed swallow, Atticora tibialis LC

== Tits, chickadees, and titmice ==
Order: Passeriformes Family: Paridae

The Paridae are mainly small stocky woodland species with short stout bills. Some have crests. They are adaptable birds, with a mixed diet including seeds and insects.

- Black-capped chickadee, Poecile atricapillus LC
- Black-crested titmouse, Baeolophus atricristatus LC
- Boreal chickadee, Poecile hudsonicus LC
- Bridled titmouse, Baeolophus wollweberi LC
- Carolina chickadee, Poecile carolinensis LC
- Chestnut-backed chickadee, Poecile rufescens LC
- Gray-headed chickadee, Poecile cinctus LC
- Juniper titmouse, Baeolophus ridgwayi LC
- Mexican chickadee, Poecile sclateri LC
- Mountain chickadee, Poecile gambeli LC
- Oak titmouse, Baeolophus inornatus LC
- Tufted titmouse, Baeolophus bicolor LC

== Penduline-tits ==
Order: Passeriformes Family: Remizidae

The penduline-tits are a family of small passerine birds, related to the true tits. The verdin is the only North American representative of its family.

- Verdin, Auriparus flaviceps LC

== Long-tailed tits ==
Order: Passeriformes Family: Aegithalidae

The long-tailed tits are a family of small passerine birds. Their plumage is typically dull gray or brown in color. There is only one North American representative of this primarily Palearctic family.

- Bushtit, Psaltriparus minimus LC

== Nuthatches ==
Order: Passeriformes Family: Sittidae

Nuthatches are small woodland birds. They have the unusual ability to climb down trees head first, unlike other birds which can only go upwards. Nuthatches have big heads, short tails and powerful bills and feet.

- Bahama nuthatch, Sitta insularis CR
- Brown-headed nuthatch, Sitta pusilla LC
- Pygmy nuthatch, Sitta pygmaea LC
- Red-breasted nuthatch, Sitta canadensis LC
- White-breasted nuthatch, Sitta carolinensis LC

== Treecreepers ==
Order: Passeriformes Family: Certhiidae

Treecreepers are small woodland birds, brown above and white below. They have thin pointed down-curved bills, which they use to extricate insects from bark. They have stiff tail feathers, like woodpeckers, which they use to support themselves on vertical trees.

- Brown creeper, Certhia americana LC

== Wrens ==
Order: Passeriformes Family: Troglodytidae

Wrens are small and inconspicuous birds, except for their loud songs. They have short wings and thin down-turned bills. Several species often hold their tails upright. All are insectivorous.

- Band-backed wren, Campylorhynchus zonatus LC
- Banded wren, Thryophilus pleurostictus LC
- Bay wren, Cantorchilus nigricapillus LC
- Bewick's wren, Thryomanes bewickii LC
- Bicolored wren, Campylorhynchus griseus LC
- Black-bellied wren, Pheugopedius fasciatoventris LC
- Black-throated wren, Pheugopedius atrogularis LC
- Boucard's wren, Campylorhynchus jocosus LC
- Buff-breasted wren, Cantorchilus leucotis LC
- Cabanis's wren, Cantorchilus modestus LC
- Cactus wren, Campylorhynchus brunneicapillus LC
- Canebrake wren, Cantorchilus zeledoni LC
- Canyon wren, Catherpes mexicanus LC
- Carolina wren, Thryothorus ludovicianus LC
- Clarión wren, Troglodytes tanneri VU
- Giant wren, Campylorhynchus chiapensis LC
- Grass wren, Cistothorus platensis LC
- Gray-barred wren, Campylorhynchus megalopterus LC
- Gray-breasted wood-wren, Henicorhina leucophrys LC
- Happy wren, Pheugopedius felix LC
- House wren, Troglodytes aedon LC (Guadeloupe wren T. a. guadeloupensis and Saint Lucia wren T. a. mesoleucus: E)
- Isthmian wren, Cantorchilus elutus
- Marsh wren, Cistothorus palustris LC
- Nava's wren, Hylorchilus navai VU
- Nightingale wren, Microcerculus philomela LC
- Ochraceous wren, Troglodytes ochraceus LC
- Pacific wren, Troglodytes pacificus LC
- Riverside wren, Cantorchilus semibadius LC
- Rock wren, Salpinctes obsoletus LC
- Rufous-and-white wren, Thryophilus rufalbus LC
- Rufous-breasted wren, Pheugopedius rutilus LC
- Rufous-browed wren, Troglodytes rufociliatus LC
- Rufous-naped wren, Campylorhynchus rufinucha LC
- Scaly-breasted wren, Microcerculus marginatus LC
- Sedge wren, Cistothorus stellaris LC
- Sinaloa wren Thryophilus sinaloa LC
- Socorro wren, Troglodytes sissonii NT
- Song wren, Cyphorhinus phaeocephalus LC
- Sooty-headed wren, Pheugopedius spadix LC
- Spot-breasted wren, Pheugopedius maculipectus LC
- Spotted wren, Campylorhynchus gularis LC
- Stripe-breasted wren, Cantorchilus thoracicus LC
- Stripe-throated wren, Cantorchilus leucopogon LC
- Sumichrast's wren, Hylorchilus sumichrasti NT
- Timberline wren, Thryorchilus browni LC
- White-bellied wren, Uropsila leucogastra LC
- White-breasted wood-wren, Henicorhina leucosticta LC
- White-headed wren, Campylorhynchus albobrunneus LC
- Winter wren, Troglodytes hiemalis LC
- Yucatan wren, Campylorhynchus yucatanicus NT
- Zapata wren, Ferminia cerverai EN

== Gnatcatchers ==
Order: Passeriformes Family: Polioptilidae

These dainty birds resemble Old World warblers in their build and habits, moving restlessly through the foliage seeking insects. The gnatcatchers and gnatwrens are mainly soft bluish gray in color and have the typical insectivore's long sharp bill. They are birds of fairly open woodland or scrub, which nest in bushes or trees.

- Black-capped gnatcatcher, Polioptila nigriceps LC
- Black-tailed gnatcatcher, Polioptila melanura LC
- Blue-gray gnatcatcher, Polioptila caerulea LC
- California gnatcatcher, Polioptila californica LC (ssp. californica: T)
- Cuban gnatcatcher, Polioptila lembeyei LC
- Long-billed gnatwren, Ramphocaenus melanurus LC
- Slate-throated gnatcatcher, Polioptila schistaceigula LC
- Tawny-faced gnatwren, Microbates cinereiventris LC
- White-browed gnatcatcher, Polioptila bilineata
- White-lored gnatcatcher, Polioptila albiloris LC
- Yucatan gnatcatcher, Polioptila albiventris

== Dippers ==
Order: Passeriformes Family: Cinclidae

They are named for their bobbing or dipping movements. They are unique among passerines for their ability to dive and swim underwater.

- American dipper, Cinclus mexicanus LC

== Bulbuls ==
Order: Passeriformes Family: Pycnonotidae

The bulbuls are a family of medium-sized passerine songbirds native to Africa and tropical Asia. These are noisy and gregarious birds with often beautiful striking songs.

- Red-whiskered bulbul Pycnonotus jocosus (I) LC

== Kinglets ==
Order: Passeriformes Family: Regulidae

The kinglets are a small family of birds which resemble the titmice. They are very small insectivorous birds in the genus Regulus. The adults have colored crowns, giving rise to their name.

- Golden-crowned kinglet, Regulus satrapa LC
- Ruby-crowned kinglet, Corthylio calendula LC

== Leaf warblers ==
Order: Passeriformes Family: Phylloscopidae

Leaf warblers are a family of small insectivorous birds found mostly in Eurasia and ranging into Wallacea and Africa. The Arctic warbler breeds east into Alaska. The species are of various sizes, often green-plumaged above and yellow below, or more subdued with grayish-green to grayish-brown colors.

- Arctic warbler, Phylloscopus borealis LC
- Common chiffchaff, Phylloscopus collybita (A) LC
- Dusky warbler, Phylloscopus fuscatus (A) LC
- Kamchatka leaf warbler, Phylloscopus examinandus (A) LC
- Pallas's leaf warbler, Phylloscopus proregulus (A) LC
- Willow warbler, Phylloscopus trochilus (A) LC
- Wood warbler, Phylloscopus sibilatrix (A) LC
- Yellow-browed warbler, Phylloscopus inornatus (A) LC

== Sylviid warblers, parrotbills, and allies ==
Order: Passeriformes Family: Sylviidae

The family Sylviidae is a group of small insectivorous passerine birds. They mainly occur as breeding species, as the common name implies, in Europe, Asia and, to a lesser extent, Africa. Most are of generally undistinguished appearance, but many have distinctive songs.

- Eurasian blackcap, Sylvia atricapilla (A) LC
- Lesser whitethroat, Sylvia curruca (A) LC
- Wrentit, Chamaea fasciata LC

== Reed warblers and allies ==
Order: Passeriformes Family: Acrocephalidae

The members of this family are usually rather large for "warblers". Most are rather plain olivaceous brown above with much yellow to beige below. They are usually found in open woodland, reedbeds, or tall grass. The family occurs mostly in southern to western Eurasia and surroundings, but also ranges far into the Pacific, with some species in Africa.

- Blyth's reed warbler, Acrocephalus dumetorum (A) LC
- Sedge warbler, Acrocephalus schoenobaenus (A) LC
- Icterine warbler, Acrocephalus icterina (A) LC
- Thick-billed warbler, Arundinax aedon (A) LC

== Donacobius ==
Order: Passeriformes Family: Donacobiidae

The black-capped donacobius is found in wet habitats from Panama across northern South America and east of the Andes to Argentina and Paraguay

- Black-capped donacobius, Donacobius atricapilla LC

== Grassbirds and allies ==
Order: Passeriformes Family: Locustellidae

Locustellidae are a family of small insectivorous songbirds found mainly in Eurasia, Africa, and the Australian region. They are smallish birds with tails that are usually long and pointed, and tend to be drab brownish or buffy all over.

- Middendorff's grasshopper warbler, Helopsaltes ochotensis (A) LC
- Pallas's grasshopper warbler, Helopsaltes certhiola (A) LC
- Lanceolated warbler, Locustella lanceolata (A) LC
- River warbler, Locustella fluviatilis (A) LC

== Old World flycatchers ==
Order: Passeriformes Family: Muscicapidae

This a large family of small passerine birds found mostly in the Old World. All but two of the species below occur in North America only as vagrants. The appearance of these birds is highly varied, but they mostly have weak songs and harsh calls.

- Asian brown flycatcher, Muscicapa dauurica (A) LC
- Bluethroat, Cyanecula svecica LC
- Common redstart, Phoenicurus phoenicurus (A) LC
- Dark-sided flycatcher, Muscicapa sibirica (A) LC
- European robin, Erithacus rubecula (A) LC
- Gray-streaked flycatcher, Muscicapa griseisticta (A) LC
- Mugimaki flycatcher, Ficedula mugimaki (A) LC
- Narcissus flycatcher, Ficedula narcissina (A) LC
- Northern wheatear, Oenanthe oenanthe LC
- Pied wheatear, Oenanthe pleschanka (A) LC
- Red-flanked bluetail, Tarsiger cyanurus (A) LC
- Rufous-tailed robin, Larvivora sibilans (A) LC
- Siberian blue robin, Larvivora cyane (A) LC
- Siberian rubythroat, Calliope calliope (A) LC
- Siberian stonechat, Saxicola maurus (A)
- Spotted flycatcher, Muscicapa striata (A) LC
- Taiga flycatcher, Ficedula albicilla (A) LC

== Thrushes and allies ==
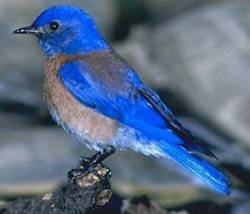
Western bluebird

Order: Passeriformes Family: Turdidae

The thrushes are a group of passerine birds that occur mainly but not exclusively in the Old World. They are plump, soft plumaged, small to medium-sized insectivores or sometimes omnivores, often feeding on the ground. Many have attractive songs.

- American robin, Turdus migratorius LC
- Aztec thrush, Ridgwayia pinicola LC
- Bicknell's thrush, Catharus bicknelli VU
- Black thrush, Turdus infuscatus LC
- Black-billed nightingale-thrush, Catharus gracilirostris LC
- Black-faced solitaire, Myadestes melanops LC
- Black-headed nightingale-thrush, Catharus mexicanus LC
- Brown-backed solitaire, Myadestes occidentalis LC
- Clay-colored thrush, Turdus grayi LC
- Cocoa thrush, Turdus fumigatus LC
- Eurasian blackbird, Turdus merula (A) LC
- Cuban solitaire, Myadestes elisabeth NT
- Dusky thrush, Turdus eunomus (A) LC
- Eastern bluebird, Sialia sialis LC
- Eyebrowed thrush, Turdus obscurus LC
- Fieldfare, Turdus pilaris LC
- Forest thrush, Cichlherminia lherminieri NT (ssp. sanctaeluciae: E)
- Grand Cayman thrush, Turdus ravidus (E) EX
- Gray-cheeked thrush, Catharus minimus LC
- Hermit thrush, Catharus guttatus LC
- La Selle thrush, Turdus swalesi VU
- Mistle Thrush, Turdus viscivorus (A) LC
- Mountain bluebird, Sialia currucoides LC
- Mountain thrush, Turdus plebejus LC
- Naumann's thrush, Turdus naumanni (A) LC
- Orange-billed nightingale-thrush, Catharus aurantiirostris LC
- Pale-vented thrush, Turdus obsoletus LC
- Western red-legged thrush, Turdus plumbeus LC
- Eastern red-legged thrush, Turdus ardosiaceus
- Redwing, Turdus iliacus NT
- Ruddy-capped nightingale-thrush, Catharus frantzii LC
- Rufous-backed robin, Turdus rufopalliatus LC
- Rufous-collared robin, Turdus rufitorques LC
- Rufous-throated solitaire, Myadestes genibarbis LC
- Russet nightingale-thrush, Catharus occidentalis LC
- Slate-colored solitaire, Myadestes unicolor LC
- Slaty-backed nightingale-thrush, Catharus fuscater LC
- Song thrush, Turdus philomelos (A) LC
- Sooty thrush, Turdus nigrescens LC
- Spectacled thrush, Turdus nudigenis LC
- Swainson's thrush, Catharus ustulatus LC
- Townsend's solitaire, Myadestes townsendi LC
- Varied solitaire, Myadestes coloratus LC
- Varied thrush, Ixoreus naevius LC
- Veery, Catharus fuscescens LC
- Western bluebird, Sialia mexicana LC
- White-chinned thrush, Turdus aurantius LC
- White-eyed thrush, Turdus jamaicensis LC
- White's thrush, Zoothera aurea (A) LC
- White-throated thrush, Turdus assimilis LC
- Wood thrush, Hylocichla mustelina LC
- Yellow-throated nightingale-thrush, Catharus dryas LC

== Mockingbirds and thrashers ==
Order: Passeriformes Family: Mimidae

The mimids are a family of passerine birds which includes thrashers, mockingbirds, tremblers and the New World catbirds. These birds are notable for their vocalization, especially their remarkable ability to mimic a wide variety of birds and other sounds heard outdoors. The species tend towards dull grays and browns in their appearance.

- Bahama mockingbird, Mimus gundlachii LC
- Bendire's thrasher, Toxostoma bendirei VU
- Black catbird, Melanoptila glabrirostris NT
- Blue mockingbird, Melanotis caerulescens LC
- Blue-and-white mockingbird, Melanotis hypoleucus LC
- Brown thrasher, Toxostoma rufum LC
- Brown trembler, Cinclocerthia ruficauda LC (ssp. gutturalis: E)
- California thrasher, Toxostoma redivivum LC
- Cozumel thrasher, Toxostoma guttatum CR
- Crissal thrasher, Toxostoma crissale LC
- Curve-billed thrasher, Toxostoma curvirostre LC
- Gray catbird, Dumetella carolinensis LC
- Gray thrasher, Toxostoma cinereum LC
- Gray trembler, Cinclocerthia gutturalis LC
- LeConte's thrasher, Toxostoma lecontei LC
- Long-billed thrasher, Toxostoma longirostre LC
- Northern mockingbird, Mimus polyglottos LC
- Ocellated thrasher, Toxostoma ocellatum LC
- Pearly-eyed thrasher, Margarops fuscatus LC
- Sage thrasher, Oreoscoptes montanus LC
- Scaly-breasted thrasher, Allenia fusca LC
- Socorro mockingbird, Mimus graysoni CR E
- Tropical mockingbird, Mimus gilvus LC
- White-breasted thrasher, Ramphocinclus brachyurus EN E

== Starlings ==
Order: Passeriformes Family: Sturnidae

Starlings and mynas are small to medium-sized Old World passerine birds with strong feet. Their flight is strong and direct and most are very gregarious. Their preferred habitat is fairly open country, and they eat insects and fruit. The plumage of several species is dark with a metallic sheen.

- European starling, Sturnus vulgaris (I) LC
- Common myna, Acridotheres tristis (I) LC

== Waxwings ==
Order: Passeriformes Family: Bombycillidae

The waxwings are a group of birds with soft silky plumage and unique red tips to some of the wing feathers. In the Bohemian and cedar waxwings, these tips look like sealing wax and give the group its name. These are arboreal birds of northern forests. They live on insects in summer and berries in winter.

- Bohemian waxwing, Bombycilla garrulus LC
- Cedar waxwing, Bombycilla cedrorum LC

== Silky-flycatchers ==
Order: Passeriformes Family: Ptiliogonatidae

The silky-flycatchers are a small family of passerine birds which occur mainly in Central America. They are related to waxwings, and like that group, have soft silky plumage, usually gray or pale-yellow.

- Black-and-yellow silky-flycatcher, Phainoptila melanoxantha LC
- Gray silky-flycatcher, Ptiliogonys cinereus LC
- Long-tailed silky-flycatcher, Ptiliogonys caudatus LC
- Phainopepla, Phainopepla nitens LC

== Palmchat ==
Order: Passeriformes Family: Dulidae

The palmchat is the only member of its family. Its name indicates its strong association with palms for feeding, roosting, and nesting.

- Palmchat, Dulus dominicus LC

== Olive warbler ==
Order: Passeriformes Family: Peucedramidae

The olive warbler is the only representative of its family. It was formally classified with the Parulidae, but DNA studies warrant its classification in a distinct family.

- Olive warbler, Peucedramus taeniatus LC

== Accentors ==
Order: Passeriformes Family: Prunellidae

The accentors are small, fairly drab birds with thin sharp bills superficially similar, but unrelated to, sparrows. They are endemic to the Palearctic and only appear in North America as a vagrant.

- Siberian accentor, Prunella montanella (A) LC

== Weavers and allies ==
Order: Passeriformes Family: Ploceidae

The weavers are small passerine birds related to the finches. They are seed-eating birds with rounded conical bills. The males of many species are brightly colored, usually in red or yellow and black, though some species show variation in color only in the breeding season.

- Village weaver, Ploceus cucullatus (I) LC
- Northern red bishop, Euplectes franciscanus (I) LC
- Yellow-crowned bishop, Euplectes afer (I) LC

== Indigobirds ==
Order: Passeriformes Family: Viduidae

The indigobirds are finch-like species which usually have black or indigo predominating in their plumage. All are brood parasites, which lay their eggs in the nests of estrildid finches

- Pin-tailed whydah, Vidua macroura (I) LC

== Waxbills and allies ==
Order: Passeriformes Family: Estrildidae

The estrildid finches are small passerine birds native to the Old World tropics. They are gregarious and often colonial seed eaters with short thick but pointed bills. They are all similar in structure and habits, but have wide variation in plumage colors and patterns.

- African silverbill, Euodice cantans (I) LC
- Black-rumped waxbill, Estrilda troglodytes (I) LC
- Bronze mannikin, Spermestes cucullata (I) LC
- Chestnut munia, Lonchura atricapilla (I) LC
- Common waxbill, Estrilda astrild (I) LC
- Indian silverbill, Euodice malabarica (I) LC
- Java sparrow, Padda oryzivora (I) EN
- Orange-cheeked waxbill, Estrilda melpoda (I) LC
- Red avadavat, Amandava amandava (I) LC
- Scaly-breasted munia, Lonchura punctulata (I) LC
- Tricolored munia, Lonchura malacca (I) LC

== Old World sparrows ==
Order: Passeriformes Family: Passeridae

Old World sparrows are small passerine birds. In general, sparrows tend to be small plump brownish or grayish birds with short tails and short powerful beaks. Sparrows are seed eaters, but they also consume small insects.

- Eurasian tree sparrow, Passer montanus (I) LC
- House sparrow, Passer domesticus (I) LC

== Wagtails and pipits ==
Order: Passeriformes Family: Motacillidae

Motacillidae is a family of small passerine birds with medium to long tails. They include the wagtails, longclaws and pipits. They are slender, ground feeding insectivores of open country.

- American pipit, Anthus rubescens LC
- Citrine wagtail, Motacilla citreola (A) LC
- Eastern yellow wagtail, Motacilla tschutschensis LC
- Gray wagtail, Motacilla cinerea (A) LC
- Meadow pipit, Anthus pratensis NT
- Olive-backed pipit, Anthus hodgsoni (A) LC
- Pechora pipit, Anthus gustavi (A) LC
- Red-throated pipit, Anthus cervinus LC
- Sprague's pipit, Anthus spragueii VU
- Tree pipit, Anthus trivialis (A) LC
- White wagtail, Motacilla alba LC
- Yellowish pipit, Anthus chii LC

== Finches, euphonias, and allies ==
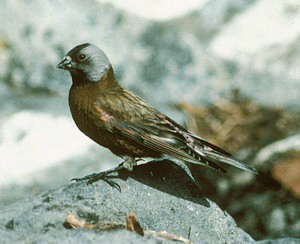
Gray-crowned rosy-finch

Order: Passeriformes Family: Fringillidae

Finches are seed-eating passerine birds, that are small to moderately large and have a strong beak, usually conical and in some species very large. All have twelve tail feathers and nine primaries. These birds have a bouncing flight with alternating bouts of flapping and gliding on closed wings, and most sing well.

- American goldfinch, Spinus tristis LC
- Antillean siskin, Spinus dominicensis LC
- Asian rosy-finch, (A) Leucosticte arctoa LC
- Island canary, Serinus canaria (I) LC
- Black rosy-finch, Leucosticte atrata EN
- Black-capped siskin, Spinus atriceps LC
- Black-headed siskin, Spinus notata LC
- Blue-crowned chlorophonia, Chlorophonia occipitalis LC
- Brambling, Fringilla montifringilla LC
- Brown-capped rosy-finch, Leucosticte australis EN
- Cassia crossbill, Loxia sinesciuris
- Cassin's finch, Haemorhous cassinii LC
- Common chaffinch, Fringilla coelebs (A) LC
- Common redpoll, Acanthis flammea LC
- Common rosefinch, Carpodacus erythrinus LC
- Elegant euphonia, Chlorophonia elegantissima LC
- Eurasian bullfinch, Pyrrhula pyrrhula (A) LC
- Eurasian siskin, Spinus spinus (A) LC
- European goldfinch, Carduelis carduelis (I) LC
- Evening grosbeak, Coccothraustes vespertinus VU
- Fulvous-vented euphonia, Euphonia fulvicrissa LC
- Golden-browed chlorophonia, Chlorophonia callophrys LC
- Gray-crowned rosy-finch, Leucosticte tephrocotis LC
- Hawfinch, Coccothraustes coccothraustes (A) LC
- Hispaniolan crossbill, Loxia megaplaga EN
- Hispaniolan euphonia, Chlorophonia musica LC
- Hoary redpoll, Acanthis hornemanni
- Hooded grosbeak, Coccothraustes abeillei LC
- House finch, Haemorhous mexicanus LC
- Jamaican euphonia, Euphonia jamaica LC
- Lawrence's goldfinch, Spinus lawrencei LC
- Lesser Antillean euphonia, Chlorophonia flavifrons }
- Lesser goldfinch, Spinus psaltria LC
- Lesser redpoll, Acanthis cabaret (A)
- Olive-backed euphonia, Euphonia gouldi LC
- Orange-bellied euphonia, Euphonia xanthogaster LC
- Oriental greenfinch, Chloris sinica (A) LC
- Pallas's rosefinch, Carpodacus roseus (A) LC
- Pine grosbeak, Pinicola enucleator LC
- Pine siskin, Spinus pinus LC
- Puerto Rican euphonia, Chlorophonia sclateri }
- Purple finch, Haemorhous purpureus LC
- Red crossbill, Loxia curvirostra LC
- Red siskin, Spinus cucullata (I) EN E
- Scrub euphonia, Euphonia affinis LC
- Spot-crowned euphonia, Euphonia imitans LC
- Tawny-capped euphonia, Euphonia anneae LC
- Thick-billed euphonia, Euphonia laniirostris LC
- West Mexican euphonia, Euphonia godmani
- White-vented euphonia, Euphonia minuta LC
- White-winged crossbill, Loxia leucoptera LC
- Yellow-bellied siskin, Spinus xanthogastra LC
- Yellow-collared chlorophonia, Chlorophonia flavirostris (A) LC
- Yellow-crowned euphonia, Euphonia luteicapilla LC
- Yellow-fronted canary, Crithagra mozambicus (I) LC
- Yellow-throated euphonia, Euphonia hirundinacea LC

== Longspurs and snow buntings ==
Order: Passeriformes Family: Calcariidae

The Calcariidae are a group of passerine birds that have been traditionally grouped with the Emberizeridae (New World sparrows), but differ in a number of respects and are usually found in open grassy areas.

- Chestnut-collared longspur, Calcarius ornatus VU
- Lapland longspur, Calcarius lapponicus LC
- McKay's bunting, Plectrophenax hyperboreus LC
- Smith's longspur, Calcarius pictus LC
- Snow bunting, Plectrophenax nivalis LC
- Thick-billed longspur, Rhynchophanes mccownii LC

== Thrush-tanager ==
Order: Passeriformes Family: Rhodinocichlidae

This species was historically placed in family Thraupidae. It was placed in its own family in 2017.

- Rosy thrush-tanager, Rhodinocichla rosea LC

== Old World buntings ==
Order: Passeriformes Family: Emberizidae

Emberizidae is a family of passerine birds containing a single genus. Until 2017, the New World sparrows (Passerellidae) were also considered part of this family.

- Gray bunting, Emberiza variabilis (A) LC
- Little bunting, Emberiza pusilla (A) LC
- Pallas's bunting, Emberiza pallasi (A) LC
- Pine bunting, Emberiza leucocephalos (A) LC
- Reed bunting, Emberiza schoeniclus (A) LC
- Rustic bunting, Emberiza rustica VU
- Yellow-breasted bunting, Emberiza aureola (A) CR
- Yellow-browed bunting, Emberiza chrysophrys (A) LC
- Yellow-throated bunting, Emberiza elegans (A) LC

== New World sparrows ==
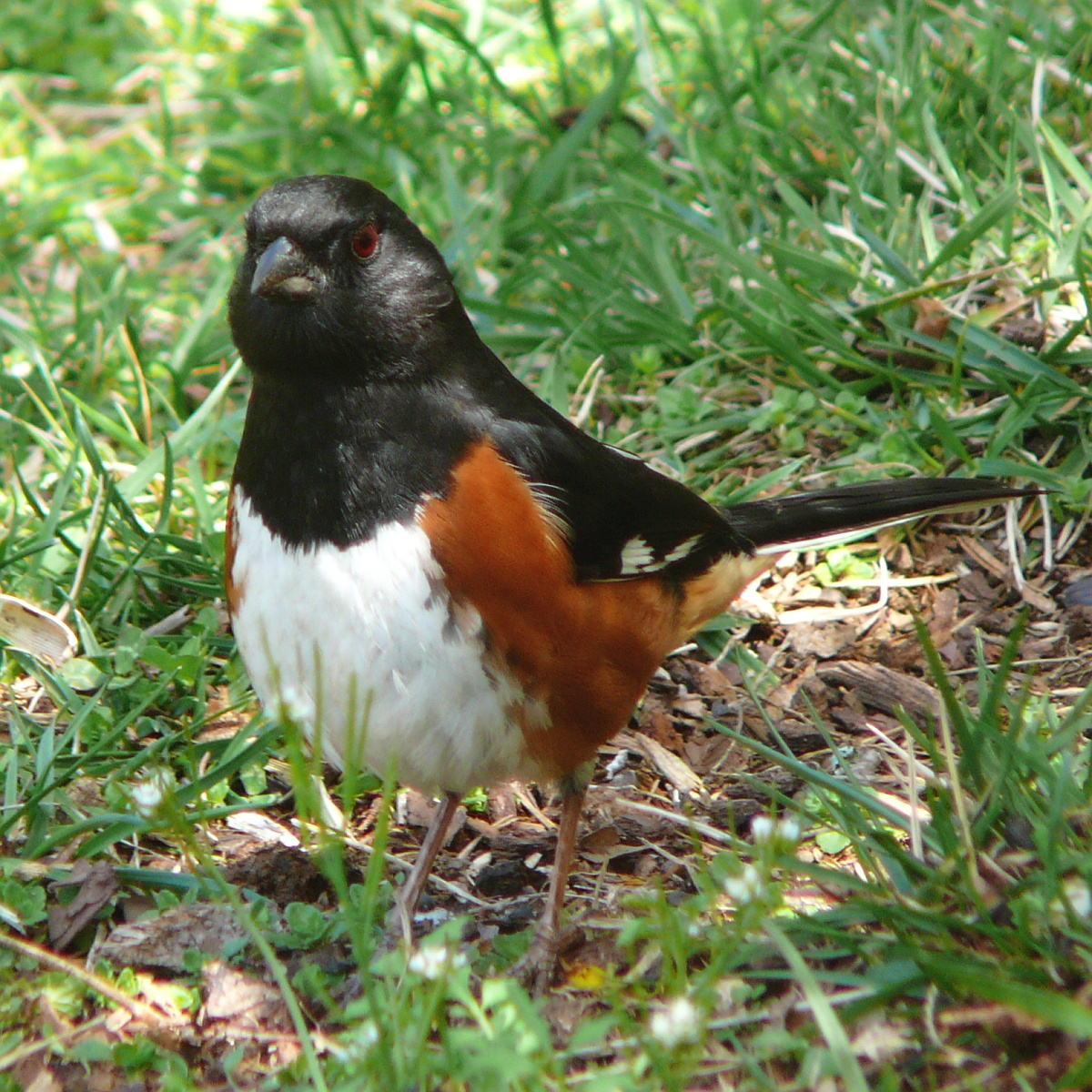
Eastern towhee

Order: Passeriformes Family: Passerellidae

Until 2017, these species were considered part of the family Emberizidae. Most of the species are known as sparrows, but these birds are not closely related to the Old World sparrows which are in the family Passeridae. Many of these have distinctive head patterns.

- Abert's towhee, Melozone aberti LC
- American tree sparrow, Spizelloides arborea LC
- Ashy-throated chlorospingus, Chlorospingus canigularis LC
- Bachman's sparrow, Peucaea aestivalis NT
- Baird's junco, Junco bairdi NT
- Baird's sparrow, Centronyx bairdii LC
- Bell's sparrow, Artemisiospiza belli LC (ssp. clementeae: T)
- Black-chested sparrow, Peucaea humeralis LC
- Black-chinned sparrow, Spizella atrogularis LC
- Black-headed brushfinch, Arremon atricapillus LC
- Black-striped sparrow, Arremonops conirostris LC
- Black-throated sparrow, Amphispiza bilineata LC
- Botteri's sparrow, Peucaea botterii LC
- Brewer's sparrow, Spizella breweri LC
- Bridled sparrow, Peucaea mystacalis LC
- Cabanis's ground-sparrow, Melozone cabanisi
- California towhee, Melozone crissalis LC (ssp. eremophilus: T)
- Canyon towhee, Melozone fusca LC
- Cassin's sparrow, Peucaea cassinii LC
- Chestnut-capped brushfinch Arremon brunneinucha LC
- Chipping sparrow, Spizella passerina LC
- Cinnamon-tailed sparrow, Peucaea sumichrasti NT
- Clay-colored sparrow, Spizella pallida LC
- Collared towhee, Pipilo ocai LC
- Common chlorospingus, Chlorospingus flavopectus LC
- Costa Rican brushfinch, Arremon costaricensis LC
- Dark-eyed junco, Junco hyemalis LC
- Eastern towhee, Pipilo erythrophthalmus LC
- Field sparrow, Spizella pusilla LC
- Five-striped sparrow, Amphispizopsis quinquestriata LC
- Fox sparrow, Passerella iliaca LC
- Golden-crowned sparrow, Zonotrichia atricapilla LC
- Grasshopper sparrow, Ammodramus savannarum LC (ssp. floridanus: E)
- Green-backed sparrow, Arremonops chloronotus LC
- Green-striped brushfinch, Arremon virenticeps LC
- Green-tailed towhee, Pipilo chlorurus LC
- Guadalupe junco, Junco insularis EN
- Harris's sparrow, Zonotrichia querula NT
- Henslow's sparrow, Centronyx henslowii LC
- Large-footed finch, Pezopetes capitalis LC
- Lark bunting, Calamospiza melanocorys LC
- Lark sparrow, Chondestes grammacus LC
- Le Conte's sparrow, Ammospiza leconteii LC
- Lincoln's sparrow, Melospiza lincolnii LC
- Nelson's sparrow, Ammospiza nelsoni LC
- Oaxaca sparrow, Aimophila notosticta LC
- Olive sparrow, Arremonops rufivirgatus LC
- Orange-billed sparrow, Arremon aurantiirostris LC
- Pirre chlorospingus, Chlorospingus inornatus LC
- Rufous-capped brushfinch, Atlapetes pileatus LC
- Rufous-collared sparrow, Zonotrichia capensis LC
- Rufous-crowned sparrow, Aimophila ruficeps LC
- Rufous-winged sparrow, Peucaea carpalis LC
- Rusty sparrow, Aimophila rufescens LC
- Rusty-crowned ground-sparrow, Melozone kieneri LC
- Sagebrush sparrow, Artemisiospiza nevadensis LC
- Saltmarsh sparrow, Ammospiza caudacuta EN
- Savannah sparrow, Passerculus sandwichensis LC
- Seaside sparrow, Ammospiza maritima LC (Cape Sable seaside sparrow A. m. mirabilis: E)
- Sierra Madre sparrow, Xenospiza baileyi EN
- Song sparrow, Melospiza melodia LC
- Sooty-capped chlorospingus, Chlorospingus pileatus LC
- Sooty-faced finch, Arremon crassirostris LC
- Spotted towhee, Pipilo maculatus LC
- Striped sparrow, Oriturus superciliosus LC
- Stripe-headed sparrow, Peucaea ruficauda LC
- Swamp sparrow, Melospiza georgiana LC
- Tacarcuna chlorospingus, Chlorospingus tacarcunae LC
- Vesper sparrow, Pooecetes gramineus LC
- Volcano junco, Junco vulcani LC
- White-crowned sparrow, Zonotrichia leucophrys LC
- White-eared ground-sparrow, Melozone leucotis LC
- White-faced ground-sparrow, Melozone biarcuata
- White-naped brushfinch, Atlapetes albinucha LC
- White-throated sparrow, Zonotrichia albicollis LC
- White-throated towhee, Melozone albicollis LC
- Worthen's sparrow, Spizella wortheni EN
- Yellow-eyed junco, Junco phaeonotus LC
- Yellow-green brushfinch, Atlapetes luteoviridis VU
- Yellow-thighed brushfinch, Atlapetes tibialis LC
- Yellow-throated chlorospingus, Chlorospingus flavigularis LC
- Zapata sparrow, Torreornis inexpectata VU

== Chat-tanagers ==
Order: Passeriformes Family: Calyptophilidae

These two species were formerly classified as tanagers (family Thraupidae) but were placed in their own family in 2017.

- Eastern chat-tanager, Calyptophilus frugivorus NT
- Western chat-tanager, Calyptophilus tertius VU

== Hispaniolan tanagers ==
Order: Passeriformes Family: Phaenicophilidae

The members of this small family were formerly classified as tanagers and New World warblers (family Parulidae) but were placed in their own family in 2017.

- Black-crowned palm-tanager, Phaenicophilus palmarum LC
- Green-tailed warbler, Microligea palustris LC
- Gray-crowned palm-tanager, Phaenicophilus poliocephalus NT
- White-winged warbler, Xenoligea montana VU

== Puerto Rican tanager ==
Order: Passeriformes Family: Nesospingidae

This species was formerly classified as a tanager (family Thraupidae) but was placed in its own family in 2017.

- Puerto Rican tanager, Nesospingus speculiferus LC

== Spindalises ==
Order: Passeriformes Family: Spindalidae

The members of this small family are native to the Greater Antilles. They were formerly classified as tanagers but were placed in their own family in 2017.

- Hispaniolan spindalis, Spindalis dominicensis LC
- Jamaican spindalis, Spindalis nigricephala LC
- Puerto Rican spindalis, Spindalis portoricensis LC
- Western spindalis, Spindalis zena LC

== Wrenthrush ==
Order: Passeriformes Family: Zeledoniidae

Despite its name, this species is neither a wren nor a thrush, and is not closely related to either family. It was moved from the wood-warblers (Parulidae) and placed in its own family in 2017.

- Wrenthrush, Zeledonia coronata LC

== Cuban warblers ==
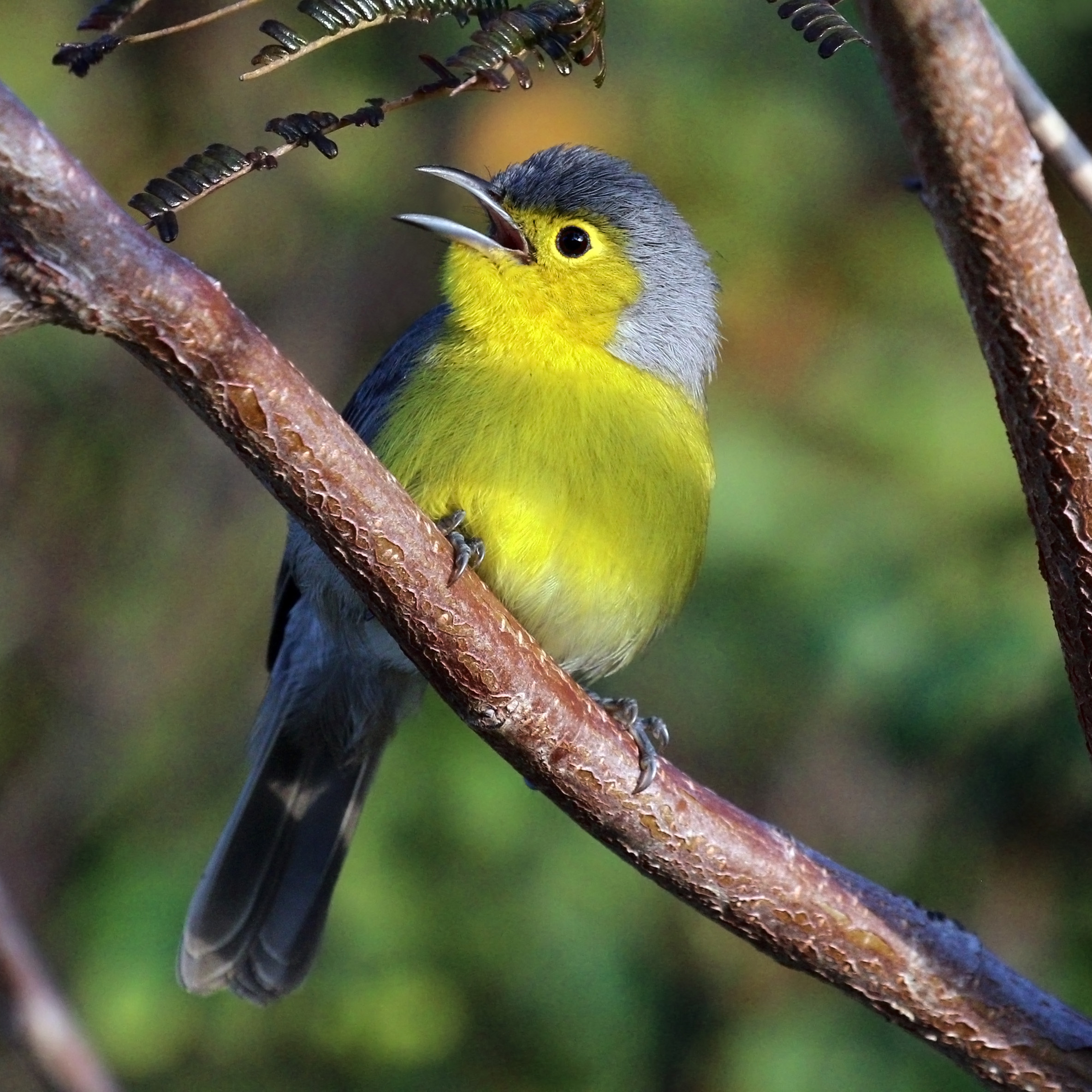
Oriente warbler

Order: Passeriformes Family: Teretistridae

These two species were formerly placed in the New World warblers (Parulidae) but were moved to their own family in 2017.

- Oriente warbler, Teretistris fornsi LC
- Yellow-headed warbler, Teretistris fernandinae LC

== Yellow-breasted chat ==
Order: Passeriformes Family: Icteriidae

This species was historically placed in the wood-warblers but nonetheless most authorities were unsure if it belonged there. It was placed in its own family in 2017.

- Yellow-breasted chat, Icteria virens LC

== Troupials and allies ==
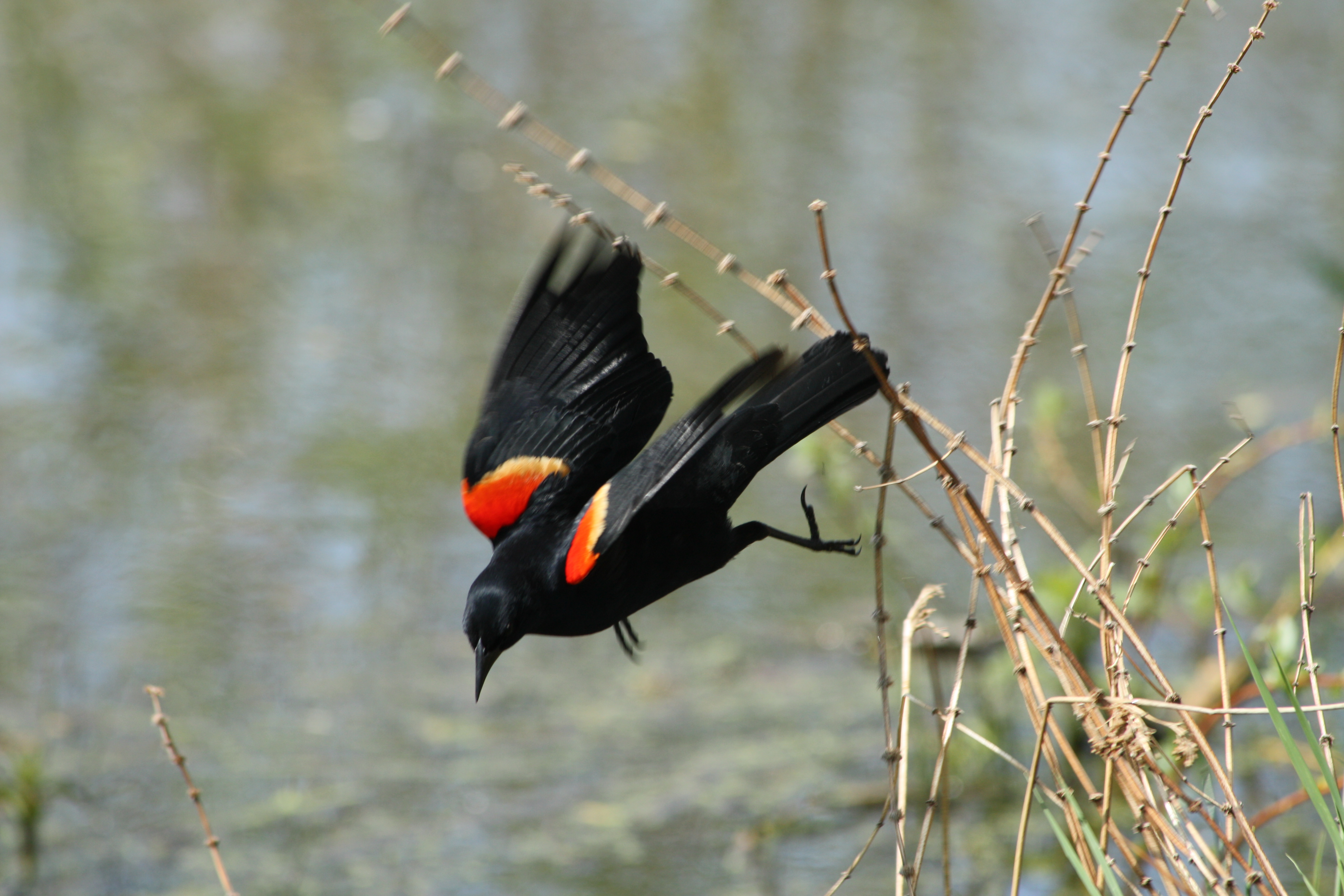
Red-winged blackbird

Order: Passeriformes Family: Icteridae

The icterids are a group of small to medium-sized, often colorful passerine birds restricted to the New World and include the grackles, New World blackbirds and New World orioles. Most species have black as a predominant plumage color, often enlivened by yellow, orange or red.

- Altamira oriole, Icterus gularis LC
- Audubon's oriole, Icterus graduacauda LC
- Bahama oriole, Icterus northropi CR
- Baltimore oriole, Icterus galbula LC
- Bar-winged oriole, Icterus maculialatus LC
- Black oropendola, Psarocolius guatimozinus LC
- Black-backed oriole, Icterus abeillei LC
- Black-cowled oriole, Icterus prosthemelas LC
- Black-vented oriole, Icterus wagleri LC
- Boat-tailed grackle, Quiscalus major LC
- Bobolink, Dolichonyx oryzivorus LC
- Brewer's blackbird, Euphagus cyanocephalus LC
- Bronzed cowbird, Molothrus aeneus LC
- Brown-headed cowbird, Molothrus ater LC
- Bullock's oriole, Icterus bullockii LC
- Carib grackle, Quiscalus lugubris LC}
- Chestnut-headed oropendola, Psarocolius wagleri LC
- Chihuahuan meadowlark, Sturnella lilianae
- Common grackle, Quiscalus quiscula NT
- Crested oropendola, Psarocolius decumanus LC
- Cuban blackbird, Ptiloxena atroviolacea LC
- Cuban oriole, Icterus melanopsis LC
- Eastern meadowlark, Sturnella magna NT
- Giant cowbird, Molothrus oryzivorus LC
- Greater Antillean grackle, Quiscalus niger LC
- Great-tailed grackle, Quiscalus mexicanus LC
- Hispaniolan oriole, Icterus dominicensis LC
- Hooded oriole, Icterus cucullatus LC
- Jamaican blackbird, Nesopsar nigerrimus EN
- Jamaican oriole, Icterus leucopteryx LC
- Martinique oriole, Icterus bonana VU
- Melodious blackbird, Dives dives LC
- Montezuma oropendola, Psarocolius montezuma LC
- Montserrat oriole, Icterus oberi VU
- Nicaraguan grackle, Quiscalus nicaraguensis LC
- Orange oriole, Icterus auratus LC
- Orange-crowned oriole, Icterus auricapillus LC
- Orchard oriole, Icterus spurius LC
- Puerto Rican oriole, Icterus portoricensis LC
- Red-breasted meadowlark, Leistes militaris LC
- Red-shouldered blackbird, Agelaius assimilis LC
- Red-winged blackbird, Agelaius phoeniceus LC
- Rusty blackbird, Euphagus carolinus VU
- Scarlet-rumped cacique, Cacicus uropygialis LC
- Scott's oriole, Icterus parisorum LC
- Shiny cowbird, Molothrus bonariensis LC
- Slender-billed grackle, Quiscalus palustris (E) EX E
- Spot-breasted oriole, Icterus pectoralis (I) LC
- St. Lucia oriole, Icterus laudabilis EN
- Streak-backed oriole, Icterus pustulatus LC
- Tawny-shouldered blackbird, Agelaius humeralis LC
- Tricolored blackbird, Agelaius tricolor EN
- Venezuelan troupial, Icterus icterus LC (I)
- Western meadowlark, Sturnella neglecta LC
- Yellow-backed oriole, Icterus chrysater LC
- Yellow-billed cacique, Amblycercus holosericeus LC
- Yellow-headed blackbird, Xanthocephalus xanthocephalus LC
- Yellow-hooded blackbird, Chrysomus icterocephalus LC
- Yellow-rumped cacique, Cacicus cela LC
- Yellow-shouldered blackbird, Agelaius xanthomus EN E
- Yellow-tailed oriole, Icterus mesomelas LC
- Yellow-winged cacique, Cassiculus melanicterus LC

== New World warblers ==
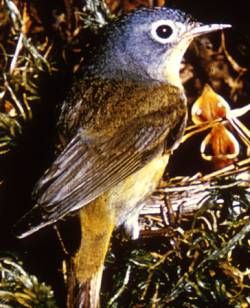
Nashville warbler

Order: Passeriformes Family: Parulidae

The wood warblers are a group of small often colorful passerine birds restricted to the New World. Most are arboreal, but some are more terrestrial. Most members of this family are insectivores. In August 2011, the North American Committee of the AOS changed their classification of many of the wood warblers. Since this list is based on the AOS classification, changes to scientific names are updated here.

- Adelaide's warbler, Setophaga adelaidae LC
- Altamira yellowthroat, Geothlypis flavovelata VU
- American redstart, Setophaga ruticilla LC
- Arrowhead warbler, Setophaga pharetra LC
- Bachman's warbler, Vermivora bachmanii (E?) CR E
- Bahama warbler, Setophaga flavescens EN
- Bahama yellowthroat, Geothlypis rostrata LC
- Barbuda warbler, Setophaga subita VU
- Bay-breasted warbler, Setophaga castanea LC
- Belding's yellowthroat, Geothlypis beldingi VU
- Black-and-white warbler, Mniotilta varia LC
- Blackburnian warbler, Setophaga fusca LC
- Black-cheeked warbler, Basileuterus melanogenys LC
- Blackpoll warbler, Setophaga striata NT
- Black-polled yellowthroat, Geothlypis speciosa VU
- Black-throated blue warbler, Setophaga caerulescens LC
- Black-throated gray warbler, Setophaga nigrescens LC
- Black-throated green warbler, Setophaga virens LC
- Blue-winged warbler, Vermivora cyanoptera LC
- Buff-rumped warbler, Myiothlypis fulvicauda LC
- Canada warbler, Cardellina canadensis LC
- Cape May warbler, Setophaga tigrina LC
- Cerulean warbler, Setophaga cerulea NT
- Chestnut-capped warbler, Basileuterus delattrii
- Chestnut-sided warbler, Setophaga pensylvanica LC
- Colima warbler, Leiothlypis crissalis LC
- Collared redstart, Myioborus torquatus LC
- Common yellowthroat, Geothlypis trichas LC
- Connecticut warbler, Oporornis agilis LC
- Costa Rican warbler, Basileuterus melanotis
- Crescent-chested warbler, Oreothlypis superciliosa LC
- Elfin-woods warbler, Setophaga angelae EN
- Fan-tailed warbler, Basileuterus lachrymosus LC
- Flame-throated warbler, Oreothlypis gutturalis LC
- Golden-browed warbler, Basileuterus belli LC
- Golden-cheeked warbler, Setophaga chrysoparia EN E
- Golden-crowned warbler, Basileuterus culicivorus LC
- Golden-winged warbler, Vermivora chrysoptera NT
- Grace's warbler, Setophaga graciae LC
- Gray-crowned yellowthroat, Geothlypis poliocephala LC
- Hermit warbler, Setophaga occidentalis LC
- Hooded warbler, Setophaga citrina LC
- Hooded yellowthroat, Geothlypis nelsoni LC
- Kentucky warbler, Geothlypis formosa LC
- Kirtland's warbler, Setophaga kirtlandii NT E
- Louisiana waterthrush, Parkesia motacilla LC
- Lucy's warbler, Leiothlypis luciae LC
- MacGillivray's warbler, Geothlypis tolmiei LC
- Magnolia warbler, Setophaga magnolia LC
- Mourning warbler, Geothlypis philadelphia LC
- Nashville warbler, Leiothlypis ruficapilla LC
- Northern parula, Setophaga americana LC
- Northern waterthrush, Parkesia noveboracensis LC
- Olive-capped warbler, Setophaga pityophila LC
- Olive-crowned yellowthroat, Geothlypis semiflava LC
- Orange-crowned warbler, Leiothlypis celata LC
- Ovenbird, Seiurus aurocapilla LC
- Painted redstart, Myioborus pictus LC
- Palm warbler, Setophaga palmarum LC
- Pine warbler, Setophaga pinus LC
- Pink-headed warbler, Cardellina versicolor LC
- Pirre warbler, Basileuterus ignotus VU
- Plumbeous warbler, Setophaga plumbea LC
- Prairie warbler, Setophaga discolor LC
- Prothonotary warbler, Protonotaria citrea LC
- Red warbler, Cardellina rubra LC
- Red-faced warbler, Cardellina rubrifrons LC
- Rufous-capped warbler, Basileuterus rufifrons LC
- Semper's warbler, Leucopeza semperi CR E
- Slate-throated redstart, Myioborus miniatus LC
- St. Lucia warbler, Setophaga delicata LC
- Swainson's warbler, Limnothlypis swainsonii LC
- Tacarcuna warbler, Basileuterus tacarcunae
- Tennessee warbler, Leiothlypis peregrina LC
- Townsend's warbler, Setophaga townsendi LC
- Tropical parula, Setophaga pitiayumi LC
- Virginia's warbler, Leiothlypis virginiae LC
- Vitelline warbler, Setophaga vitellina NT
- Whistling warbler, Catharopeza bishopi EN
- Wilson's warbler, Cardellina pusilla LC
- Worm-eating warbler, Helmitheros vermivorus LC
- Yellow warbler, Setophaga petechia LC (ssp. petechia: E)
- Yellow-rumped warbler, Setophaga coronata LC
- Yellow-throated warbler, Setophaga dominica LC

== Mitrospingid tanagers ==
Order: Passeriformes Family: Mitrospingidae

The members of this small family were previously included in Thraupidae ("true" tanagers). They were placed in this new family in 2017.

- Dusky-faced tanager, Mitrospingus cassinii LC

== Cardinals and allies ==
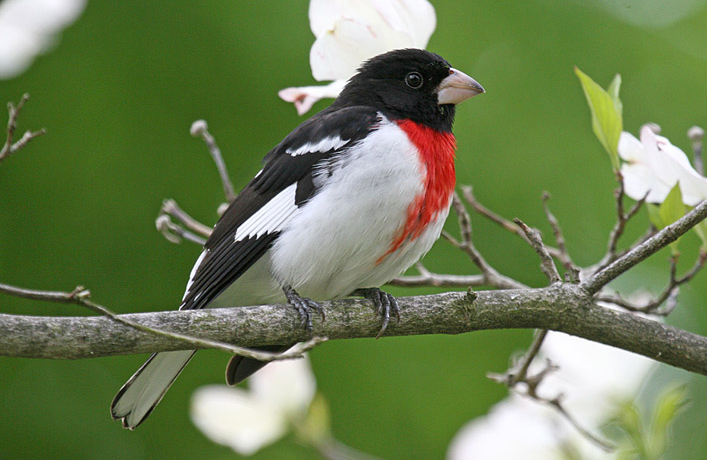
Rose-breasted grosbeak

Order: Passeriformes Family: Cardinalidae

The cardinals are a family of robust, seed-eating birds with strong bills. They are typically associated with open woodland. The sexes usually have distinct plumages.

- Black-cheeked ant-tanager, Habia atrimaxillaris EN
- Black-faced grosbeak, Caryothraustes poliogaster LC
- Black-headed grosbeak, Pheucticus melanocephalus LC
- Black-thighed grosbeak, Pheucticus tibialis LC
- Blue bunting, Cyanocompsa parellina LC
- Blue grosbeak, Passerina caerulea LC
- Blue seedeater, Amaurospiza concolor LC
- Blue-black grosbeak, Cyanoloxia cyanoides LC
- Carmiol's tanager, Chlorothraupis carmioli
- Crimson-collared grosbeak, Rhodothraupis celaeno LC
- Dickcissel, Spiza americana LC
- Flame-colored tanager, Piranga bidentata LC
- Gray-throated chat, Granatellus sallaei LC
- Hepatic tanager, Piranga flava LC
- Indigo bunting, Passerina cyanea LC
- Lazuli bunting, Passerina amoena LC
- Lemon-spectacled tanager, Chlorothraupis olivacea LC
- Northern cardinal, Cardinalis cardinalis LC
- Orange-breasted bunting, Passerina leclancherii LC
- Painted bunting, Passerina ciris LC
- Pyrrhuloxia, Cardinalis sinuatus LC
- Red-breasted chat, Granatellus venustus LC
- Red-crowned ant-tanager, Habia rubica LC
- Red-headed tanager, Piranga erythrocephala LC
- Red-throated ant-tanager, Habia fuscicauda LC
- Rose-bellied bunting, Passerina rositae NT
- Rose-breasted grosbeak, Pheucticus ludovicianus LC
- Rose-throated tanager, Piranga roseogularis LC
- Scarlet tanager, Piranga olivacea LC
- Summer tanager, Piranga rubra LC
- Varied bunting, Passerina versicolor LC
- Western tanager, Piranga ludoviciana LC
- White-winged tanager, Piranga leucoptera LC
- Yellow grosbeak, Pheucticus chrysopeplus LC
- Yellow-green grosbeak, Caryothraustes canadensis LC

== Tanagers and allies ==
Order: Passeriformes Family: Thraupidae

The tanagers are a large group of small to medium-sized passerine birds restricted to the New World, mainly in the tropics. Many species are brightly colored. They are seed eaters, but their preference tends towards fruit and nectar. Most have short, rounded wings.

- Azure-rumped tanager, Poecilostreptus cabanisi VU
- Bananaquit, Coereba flaveola LC
- Barbados bullfinch, Loxigilla barbadensis LC
- Bay-headed tanager, Tangara gyrola LC
- Black-and-yellow tanager, Chrysothlypis chrysomelas LC
- Black-faced grassquit, Melanospiza bicolor LC
- Black-headed saltator, Saltator atriceps LC
- Black-throated shrike-tanager, Lanio aurantius LC
- Blue dacnis, Dacnis cayana LC
- Blue-and-gold tanager, Bangsia arcaei NT
- Blue-black grassquit, Volatinia jacarina LC
- Blue-gray tanager, Thraupis episcopus LC
- Buff-throated saltator, Saltator maximus LC
- Cinnamon-bellied flowerpiercer, Diglossa baritula LC
- Cinnamon-bellied saltator, Saltator grandis LC
- Cinnamon-rumped seedeater, Sporophila torqueola LC
- Cocos finch, Pinaroloxias inornata VU
- Crimson-backed tanager, Ramphocelus dimidiatus LC
- Crimson-collared tanager, Ramphocelus sanguinolentus LC
- Cuban bullfinch, Melopyrrha nigra LC
- Cuban grassquit, Phonipara canora LC
- Emerald tanager, Tangara florida LC
- Flame-rumped tanager, Ramphocelus flammigerus LC
- Golden-hooded tanager, Stilpnia larvata LC
- Grassland yellow-finch, Sicalis luteola LC
- Greater Antillean bullfinch, Melopyrrha violacea LC
- Green honeycreeper, Chlorophanes spiza LC
- Green-naped tanager, Tangara fucosa NT
- Gray-and-gold tanager, Poecilostreptus palmeri LC
- Gray-headed tanager, Eucometis penicillata LC
- Large-billed seed-finch, Sporophila crassirostris LC
- Lesser Antillean bullfinch, Loxigilla noctis LC
- Lesser Antillean saltator, Saltator albicollis LC
- Lesser Antillean tanager, Stilpnia cucullata LC
- Lined seedeater, Sporophila lineola LC
- Morelet's seedeater, Sporophila morelleti LC
- Nicaraguan seed-finch, Sporophila nuttingi LC
- Orangequit, Euneornis campestris LC
- Palm tanager Thraupis palmarum LC
- Peg-billed finch, Acanthidops bairdi LC
- Plain-colored tanager, Tangara inornata LC
- Puerto Rican bullfinch, Melopyrrha portoricensis LC
- Purple honeycreeper, Cyanerpes caeruleus LC
- Red-legged honeycreeper, Cyanerpes cyaneus LC
- Ruddy-breasted seedeater, Sporophila minuta LC
- Rufous-winged tanager, Tangara lavinia LC
- Saffron finch, Sicalis flaveola (I) LC
- Scarlet-browed tanager, Heterospingus xanthopygius LC
- Scarlet-rumped tanager, Ramphocelus passerinii LC
- Scarlet-thighed dacnis, Dacnis venusta LC
- Shining honeycreeper, Cyanerpes lucidus LC
- Silver-throated tanager, Tangara icterocephala LC
- Slate-colored grosbeak, Saltator grossus LC
- Slate-colored seedeater, Sporophila schistacea LC
- Slaty finch, Haplospiza rustica LC
- Slaty flowerpiercer, Diglossa plumbea LC
- Spangle-cheeked tanager, Tangara dowii LC
- Speckled tanager, Ixothraupis guttata LC
- St. Kitts bullfinch, Melopyrrha grandis
- St. Lucia black finch, Melanospiza richardsoni EN
- Streaked saltator, Saltator striatipectus LC
- Sulphur-rumped tanager, Heterospingus rubrifrons LC
- Swallow tanager, Tersina viridis LC
- Tawny-crested tanager, Tachyphonus delatrii LC
- Thick-billed seed-finch, Sporophila funerea LC
- Variable seedeater, Sporophila corvina LC
- Viridian dacnis, Dacnis viguieri LC
- Wedge-tailed grass-finch, Emberizoides herbicola LC
- White-eared conebill, Conirostrum leucogenys LC
- White-lined tanager, Tachyphonus rufus LC
- White-shouldered tanager, Loriotus luctuosus LC
- White-throated shrike-tanager, Lanio leucothorax LC
- Yellow-backed tanager, Hemithraupis flavicollis LC
- Yellow-bellied seedeater, Sporophila nigricollis LC
- Yellow-faced grassquit, Tiaris olivaceus LC
- Yellow-shouldered grassquit, Loxipasser anoxanthus LC
- Yellow-winged tanager, Thraupis abbas LC

== See also ==
- Lists of birds by region
- List of mammals of Mexico
- List of reptiles of North America
- List of amphibians of North America
- List of hummingbirds of North America
