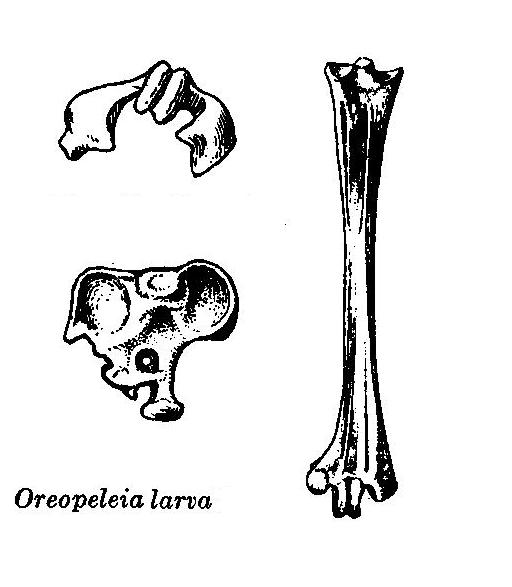
- Bones of the Puerto Rican quail-dove

Conservation status
- Extinct

Scientific classification
- Kingdom: Animalia
- Phylum: Chordata
- Class: Aves
- Order: Columbiformes
- Family: Columbidae
- Genus: Geotrygon
- Species: †G. larva

Binomial name
- †Geotrygon larva (Wetmore, 1920)

Synonyms
- Oreopela larva

= Puerto Rican quail-dove =

Puerto Rican quail-dove Temporal range: Early Holocene

Extinct species of quail-dove

The Puerto Rican quail-dove (Geotrygon larva) is an extinct species of dove from the genus of quail-doves Geotrygon. It is only known by subfossil material from the Holocene of Puerto Rico.

== Taxonomy ==
According to Alexander Wetmore who described this species, it was related to the grey-fronted quail-dove (Geotrygon caniceps), which occurs on Cuba. The tarsometatarsus of the Puerto Rican quail-dove is longer than in the grey-fronted quail-dove. Compared with the ruddy quail-dove (G. montana), which presently occurs on Puerto Rico, the tarsometatarsi are more slender.

== Discovery ==
Remains of the Puerto Rican quail-dove were unearthed in the Cueva Clara and Cueva Catedral near Morovis, in the Cueva Toraño at Utuado, and in a kitchen midden near Mayagüez on Puerto Rico. The holotype, a tarsometatarsus, was discovered in July 1916 by zoologist Harold Elmer Anthony in the Cueva Clara.

== Extinction ==
The large amount of unearthed material led to the assumption that the Puerto Rican quail-dove might have been a common bird before the initial arrival of humans to the island. Its extinction may have been due to deforestation.
