= Quail-dove =

Quail-dove may refer to a bird in one of four genera in the pigeon and dove family Columbidae:

- Geotrygon
- Leptotrygon
- Reinwardtoena
- Starnoenas
