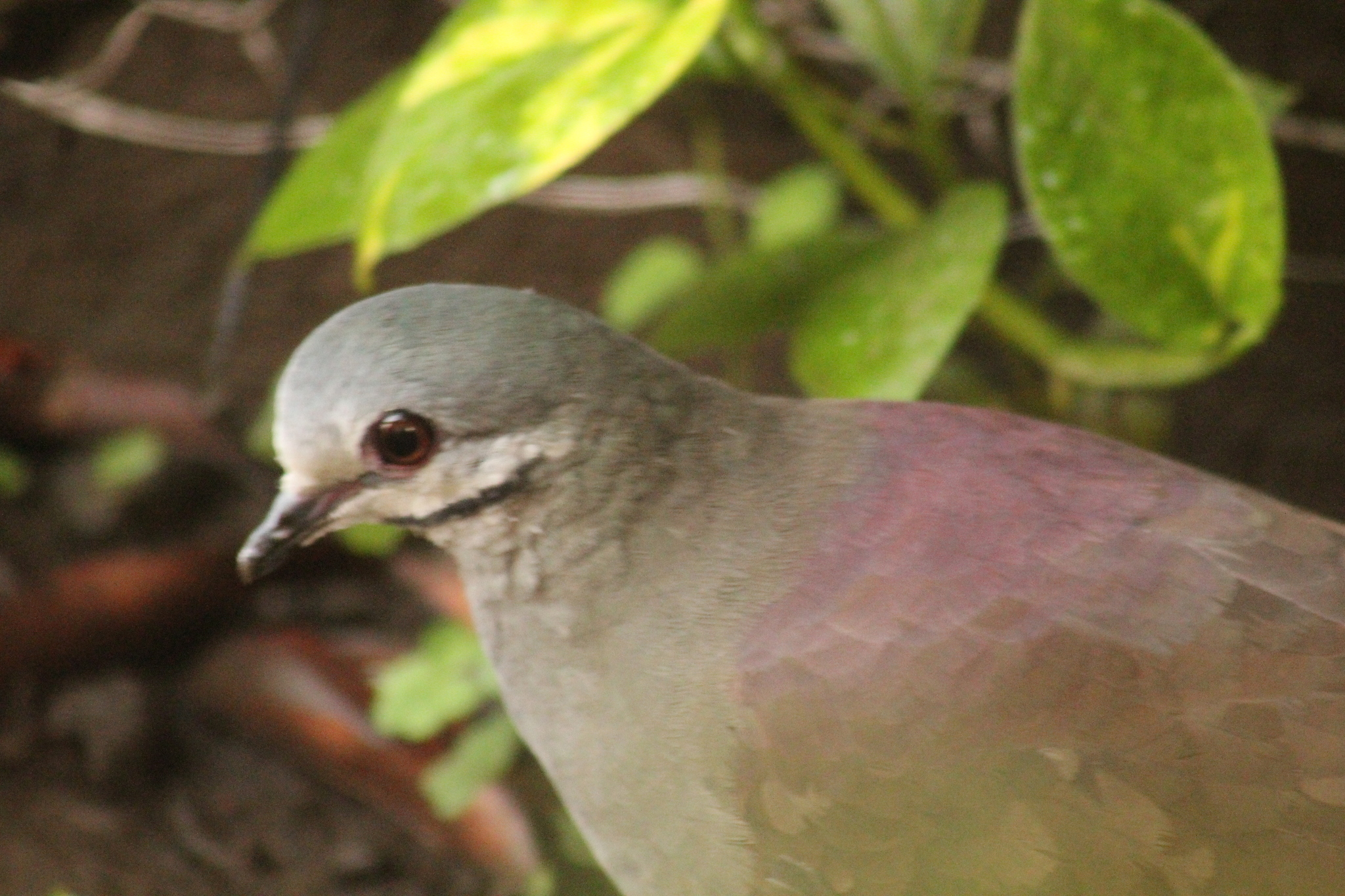

Conservation status
- Endangered (IUCN 3.1)

Scientific classification
- Domain: Eukaryota
- Kingdom: Animalia
- Phylum: Chordata
- Class: Aves
- Order: Columbiformes
- Family: Columbidae
- Genus: Zentrygon
- Species: Z. carrikeri

Binomial name
- Zentrygon carrikeri (Wetmore, 1941)

Synonyms
- Geotrygon carrikeri

= Tuxtla quail-dove =

Species of bird

The Tuxtla quail-dove or Veracruz quail-dove (Zentrygon carrikeri) is a species of bird in the family Columbidae. It is endemic to southeastern Mexico.

== Taxonomy and systematics ==
The Tuxtla quail-dove is monotypic. It and the purplish-backed quail-dove (Zentrygon lawrencii) of Central America were previously considered conspecific.

== Description ==
The Tuxtla quail-dove is 20 to 31.5 cm (7.9 to 12.4 in) long. The adult's head, neck, throat and breast are light bluish gray and the flanks light brown. It has a wide black malar stripe. Its back and wings are olive brown with little iridescence. Juveniles are darker all over with cinnamon edges to the upperparts' feathers and buff bars on the breast.

== Distribution and habitat ==
The Tuxtla quail-dove is found only on two volcanoes in the Sierra de los Tuxtlas of southeastern Mexico's Veracruz state, Volcán de San Martín and Sierra de Santa Marta. It inhabits humid evergreen forest and cloudforest at elevations between 350 and 2,100 m (1,150 and 6,890 ft).

== Behavior ==
=== Feeding ===
The Tuxtla quail-dove forages singly or in pairs. No details of its diet have been published but it probably feeds on fruit, seeds, and invertebrates found in leaf litter.

=== Breeding ===
The only documented Tuxtla quail-dove nest was a loosely constructed platform supported by bamboo shoots; it contained one egg.

=== Vocalization ===
The Tuxtla quail-dove's song is "a three-syllable note 'whu-hu-whUuuw', with a clear emphasis on the last syllable." The overslurred last syllable is all that is usually heard at a distance.

== Status ==
The IUCN has assessed the Tuxtla quail-dove as Endangered due to its very small and fragmented range that has undergone almost complete deforestation.
