= Craugastor vulcani =

Conservation status
- Endangered (IUCN 3.1)

Scientific classification
- Kingdom: Animalia
- Phylum: Chordata
- Class: Amphibia
- Order: Anura
- Clade: Brachycephaloidea
- Family: Craugastoridae
- Genus: Craugastor
- Species: C. vulcani

Binomial name
- Craugastor vulcani (Shannon and Werler, 1955)

Synonyms
- Eleutherodactylus vulcani Shannon and Werler, 1955

Species of frog

Craugastor vulcani is a species of frog in the family Craugastoridae. It is endemic to the Sierra de los Tuxtlas range in southern Veracruz state, Mexico. Its name refers to its type locality on the San Martin Tuxtla volcano. Common name Volcan San Martin rainfrog has been proposed for it.

== Description ==
Adult males measure 40–47 mm (1.6–1.9 in) in snout–vent length [although males as small 31 mm SVL had nuptial pads] and adult females 60–75 mm (2.4–3.0 in) SVL. The tympanum is distinct. The fingers and toes bear well-developed discs. The fingers have lateral keels while the toes have lateral flanges and are moderately webbed. The eyelids have numerous medium-sized, rounded tubercles. Skin of the dorsum is rugose with groups of tubercles and short glandular folds, and typically with well-defined parietal and suprascapular ridges. The dorsal coloration is variable: olive brown, reddish brown, or dark smokey gray, and either uniformly colored or with an irregular middorsal yellow or orange stripe; some individuals are mottled with dark brown. The sides are paler, usually pale yellow-brown or tan suffused with brown. The venter is cream to buff. Males have dark melanophores in their chest and belly while females have immaculate bellies. The iris is bronze.

== Habitat and conservation ==
Craugastor vulcani occurs in premontane and lower montane wet forests at elevations up to 1,200 m (4,000 ft) above sea level. It occurs along streams. Development is direct (i.e., there is no free-living larval stage).

The species is threatened by habitat loss (deforestation) and its distribution area is small, prompting classification as an endangered species. It occurs in the Los Tuxtlas Biosphere Reserve, but significant deforestation is occurring in this reserve.
