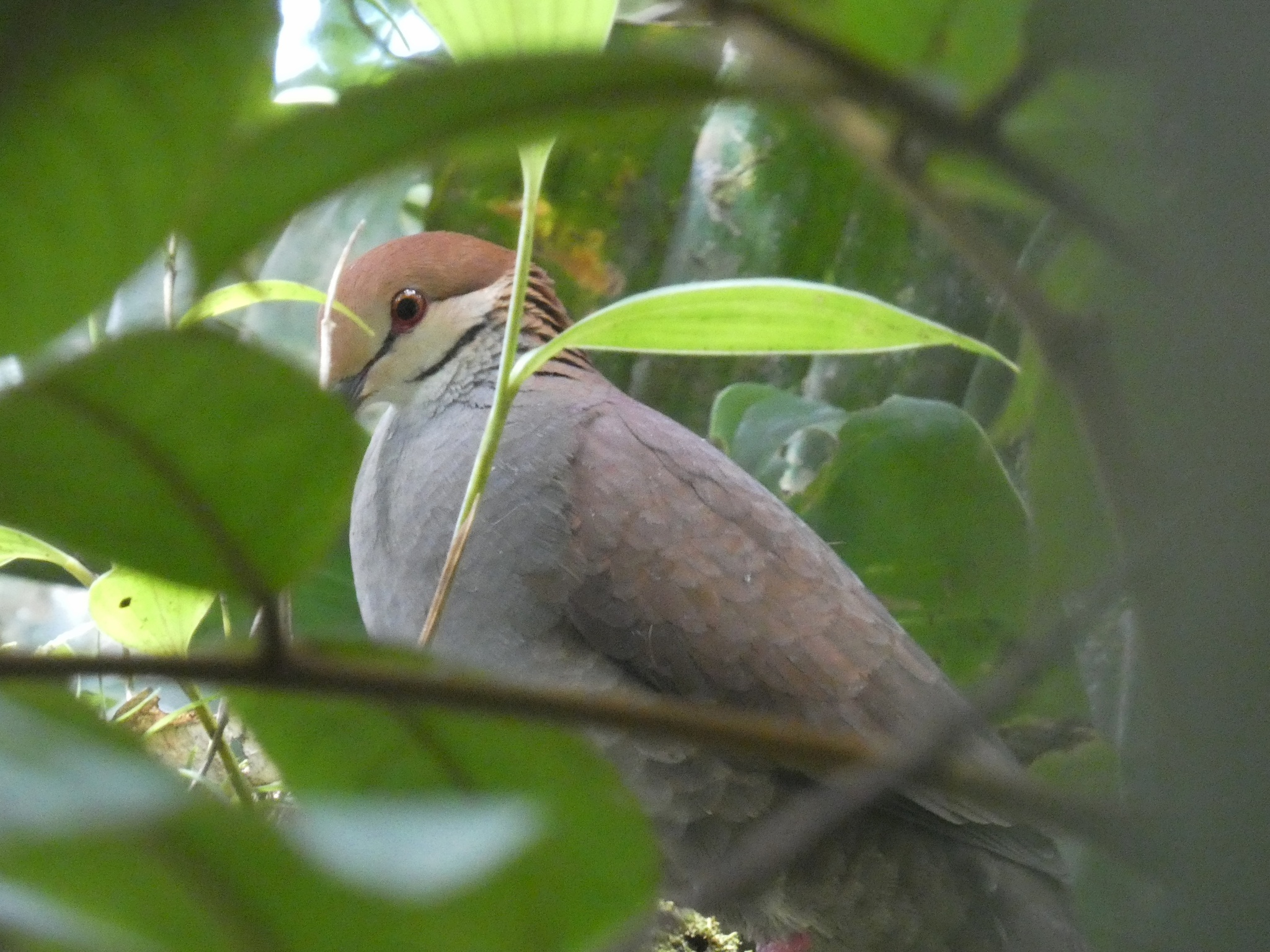

Conservation status
- Near Threatened (IUCN 3.1)

Scientific classification
- Kingdom: Animalia
- Phylum: Chordata
- Class: Aves
- Order: Columbiformes
- Family: Columbidae
- Genus: Zentrygon
- Species: Z. goldmani

Binomial name
- Zentrygon goldmani (Nelson, 1912)

Synonyms
- Geotrygon goldmani; Oreopelia goldmani

= Russet-crowned quail-dove =

Species of bird

The russet-crowned quail-dove (Zentrygon goldmani) is a species of bird in the family Columbidae. It is found in Panama and far northwestern Colombia.

== Taxonomy and systematics ==
The russet-crowned quail-dove was originally described in genus Geotrygon, then later placed in genus Oreopelia, and later still in its present Zentrygon. It is thought to be closely related to the lined quail-dove (Z. linearis). It has two subspecies, the nominate Z. g. goldmani and Z. g. oreas.

== Description ==
Male russet-crowned quail-doves are 26.5 to 28.5 cm (10.4 to 11.2 in) long and females 27 to 28 cm (11 to 11 in). Adults weigh about 258 g (9.1 oz). Audlt males of the nominate subspecies have a russet brown crown and nape with a lighter forehead and the rest of the face. They have a black malar stripe. The hindneck is brown and the upperparts and wings brown with a purple tinge. The throat and breast are gray, the belly whitish gray, and the flanks brown. The eye is orange with a red rim surrounded by bare gray skin, and there is a red spot in front of the eye. The legs and feet are red. The female's gray breast has a brown tinge and the wings are a less reddish brown than the male's. Juveniles' upperparts are dull buffy cinnamon and the underparts are dusky brown with reddish buff feather edges. Adults of Z. g. oreas are overall darker than the nominate but otherwise similar.

== Distribution and habitat ==
The nominate subspecies of russet-crowned quail-dove is resident from Panama's eastern Panamá Province through Darién Province into extreme northwestern Colombia. Z. g. oreas is found in eastern Panama but west of the nominate. It inhabits subtropical forest in foothills and lower highlands, generally at elevations between 750 and 1,600 m (2,460 and 5,250 ft) but as low as 90 m (300 ft) in Colombia.

== Behavior ==
=== Feeding ===
The russet-crowned quail-dove usually feeds on the forest floor; its diet is primarily seeds.

=== Breeding ===
Essentially nothing is known about the russet-crowned quail-dove's breeding phenology.

=== Vocalization ===
The russet-crowned quail-dove's song is "a single slightly overslurred note 'wOuu', sometimes sounding bi-syllabic."

== Status ==
The IUCN has assessed the russet-crowned quail-dove as Near Threatened. It has a small range and its population has declined due to habitat loss. "[E]xtensive research [is] required, as well as surveys in order to establish [its] population size and trends."
