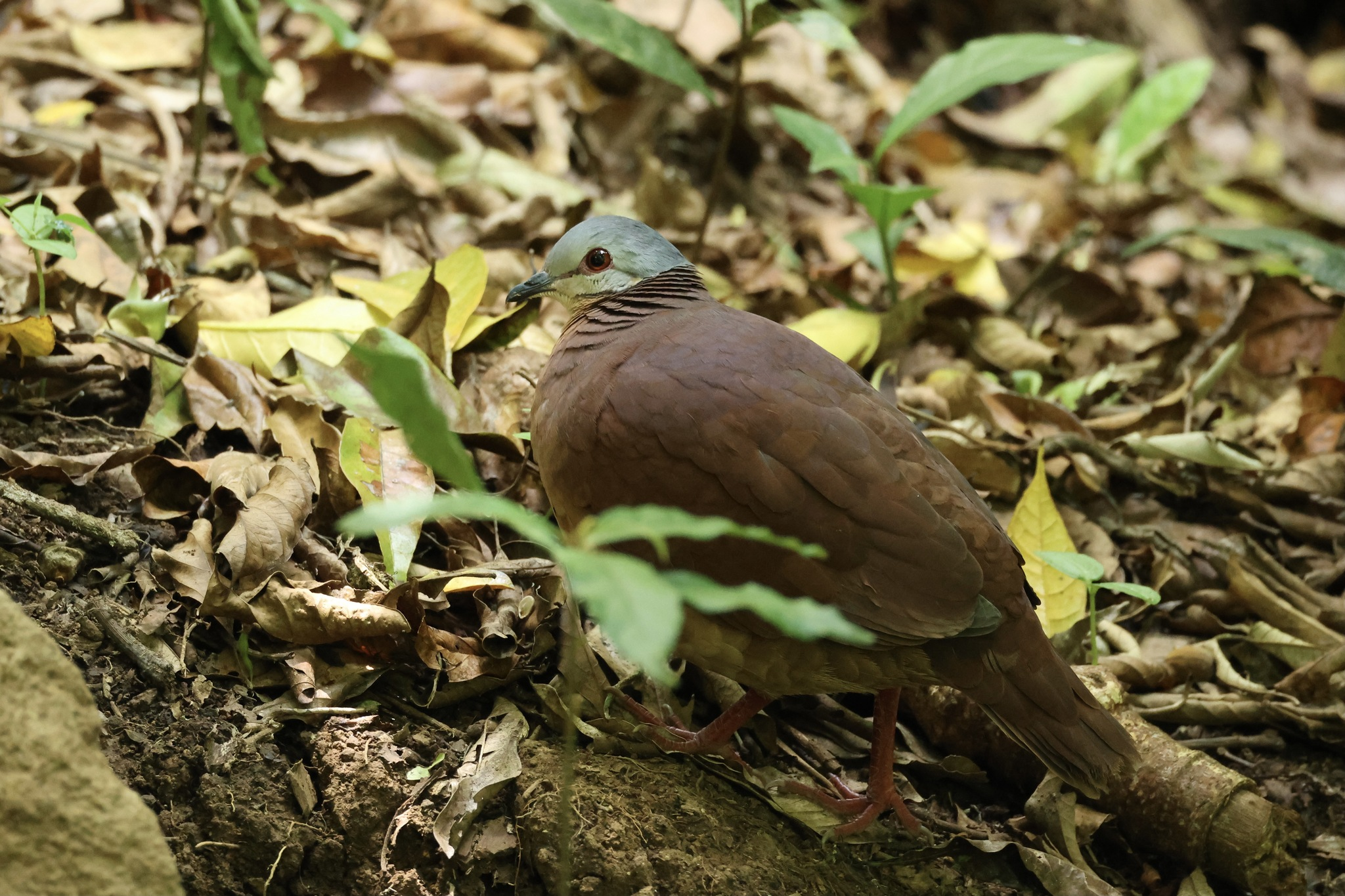

Conservation status
- Least Concern (IUCN 3.1)

Scientific classification
- Kingdom: Animalia
- Phylum: Chordata
- Class: Aves
- Order: Columbiformes
- Family: Columbidae
- Genus: Zentrygon
- Species: Z. chiriquensis

Binomial name
- Zentrygon chiriquensis (Sclater, PL, 1856)

Synonyms
- Geotrygon chiriquensis

= Chiriqui quail-dove =

Chiriquí quail-dove

Species of bird

The Chiriqui quail-dove or rufous-breasted quail-dove (Zentrygon chiriquensis) is a species of bird in the family Columbidae. It is found in Costa Rica and Panama.

== Taxonomy and systematics ==
The Chiriqui quail-dove is monotypic. It was originally described in genus Geotrygon and is sometimes considered conspecific with the white-faced quail-dove (Z. albifacies) and the lined quail-dove (Z. linearis).

== Description ==
The male Chiriqui quail-dove is 27 to 31 cm (11 to 12 in) long and the female 26 to 32 cm (10 to 13 in). Adults weigh between 295 and 308 g (10.4 and 10.9 oz). The adult male has a slate gray crown that is paler on the forehead and darker on the nape. The rest of the face is buffy with a black malar stripe and a thin black line through the eye. The eye is brownish orange surrounded by bare red skin. The upperparts transition from chestnut on the shoulders through purplish on the upper back to olivaceous with a greenish gloss on the lower back. The chin is buffy white that darkens to reddish on the chest and sides and then lightens to cinnamon buff on the belly; the flanks are a darker cinnamon. Females are very similar, but their breast is usually darker. Juveniles have a brown crown and upperparts and the underparts have dull black bars.

== Distribution and habitat ==
The Chiriqui quail-dove is resident from the Cordillera de Guanacaste in northern Costa Rica to Chiriquí and Veraguas Provinces in western Panama. It inhabits the understory of drier parts of the Talamancan montane forests. On the Caribbean side it generally ranges from 600 to 1,700 m (2,000 to 5,600 ft) but can be found locally as high as 2,000 m (6,600 ft). On the Pacific side it usually ranges between 1,000 and 2,500 m (3,300 and 8,200 ft) and occasionally up to 3,100 m (10,200 ft).

== Behavior ==
=== Feeding ===
The Chiriqui quail-dove forages on the ground, singly or in pairs. Its diet is seeds, fallen fruit, and small invertebrates. It usually feeds in cover but can be seen along roads and trails in early morning.

=== Breeding ===
The Chiriqui quail-dove's nesting season includes August and September but its extent is not known. It builds a shallow cup nest of twigs and leaves and places it on a tree branch. The clutch size is two eggs.

=== Vocalization ===
The Chiriqui quail-dove's song is "a single monotonous note 'wooOoh', gradually swelling in amplitude." It sings "incessantly during breeding season from a perch".

== Status ==
The IUCN has assessed the Chiriqui quail-dove as being of Least Concern based on the size of its range and population estimates, though the population is thought to be declining. Little is known about its biology and ecology, and research is needed "as well as surveys to establish [its] true status."
