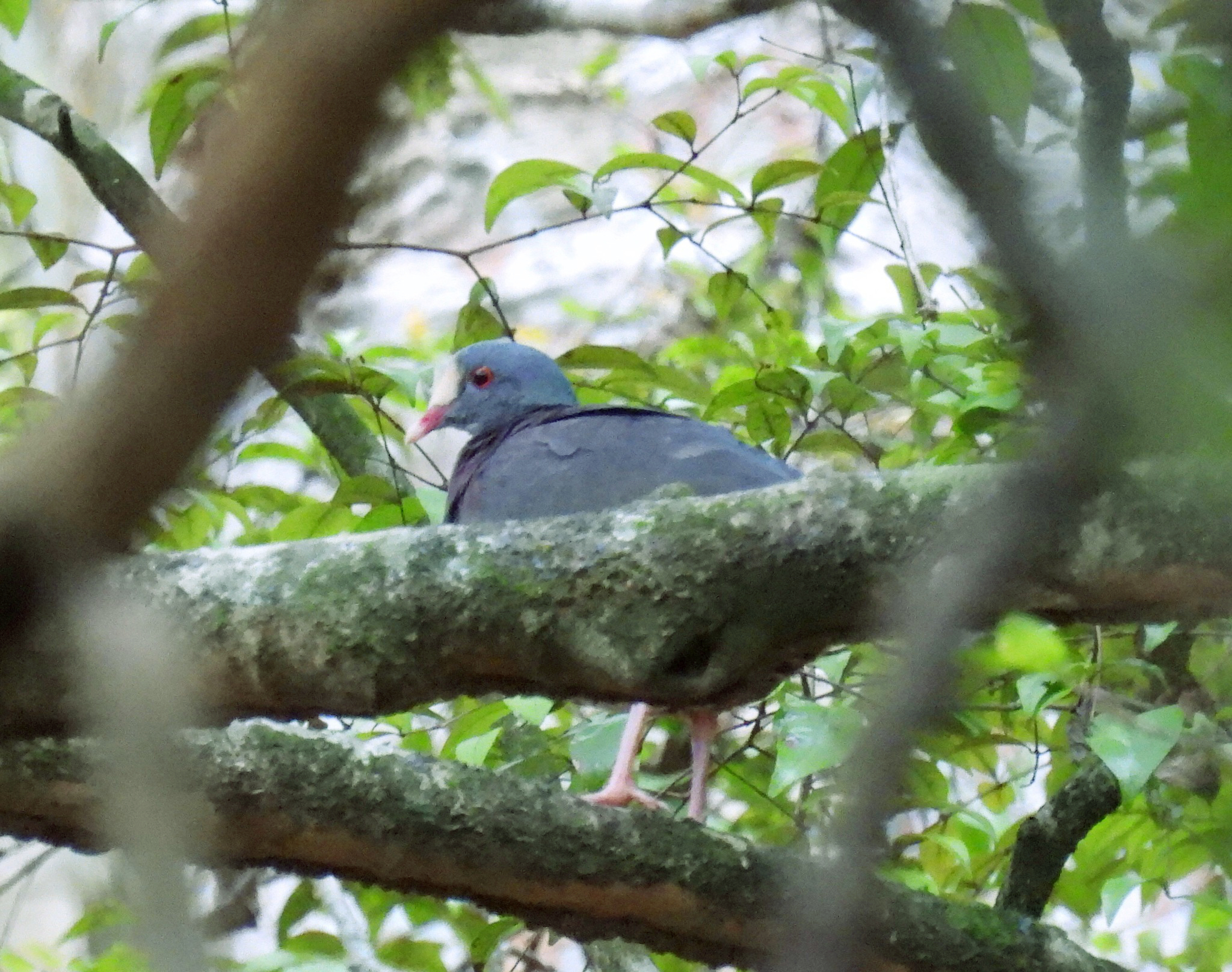

Conservation status
- Endangered (IUCN 3.1)

Scientific classification
- Domain: Eukaryota
- Kingdom: Animalia
- Phylum: Chordata
- Class: Aves
- Order: Columbiformes
- Family: Columbidae
- Genus: Geotrygon
- Species: G. leucometopia

Binomial name
- Geotrygon leucometopia (Chapman, 1917)

Synonyms
- Oreopeleia caniceps leucometopia

= White-fronted quail-dove =

Species of bird

The white-fronted quail-dove (Geotrygon leucometopia) is a species of bird in the family Columbidae. It is endemic to the Dominican Republic on the Caribbean island of Hispaniola; it is possibly extirpated from Haiti.

== Taxonomy and systematics ==
The white-fronted quail-dove and most of the other species in the genus Geotrygon were previously in Oreopeleia. In addition, it was considered conspecific with what is now the grey-fronted quail-dove (Geotrygon caniceps) under the name "grey-headed quail-dove". It is monotypic.

== Description ==
The white-fronted quail-dove is about 28 cm (11 in) long, and weighs about 171 g (6.0 oz). The adult has a bold white forehead ("front"), and the rest of its head is slate gray. The sides of its neck have a reddish purple or violet cast that sometimes extends onto the gray breast. The lower belly is reddish. The upperparts are a darker gray than the head and have a metallic purplish blue sheen. Its eyes are red. Juveniles are browner than adults, and do not have the purple sheen on the neck and breast.

== Distribution and habitat ==
The white-fronted quail-dove is confirmed to exist only in a few areas in the west of the Dominican Republic. Unconfirmed historical accounts placed it in adjoining southeastern Haiti as well. It inhabits low elevation subtropical forests, montane forest possibly as high as 1,800 m (5,900 ft), and a few arid areas with cactus and scrub.

== Behavior ==
=== Feeding ===
The white-fronted quail-dove's diet is seeds and small invertebrates like insects, grubs, and caterpillars.

=== Breeding ===
The white-fronted quail-dove builds a nest of twigs and leaves lined with rootlets and grass and places it low in undergrowth or a vine tangle. The clutch size is usually one or two, but three eggs have been reported.

=== Vocalization ===
The white-fronted quail-dove's song is a "long series of short, low-pitched 'haoo' or 'cooo' notes, given either very rapidly in the former instance or more slowly...in [the] second".

== Status ==
The IUCN has assessed the white-fronted quail-dove as Endangered. It has a very small range and its estimated population of fewer than 1700 adults is declining due to habitat loss, hunting, and introduced predators.
