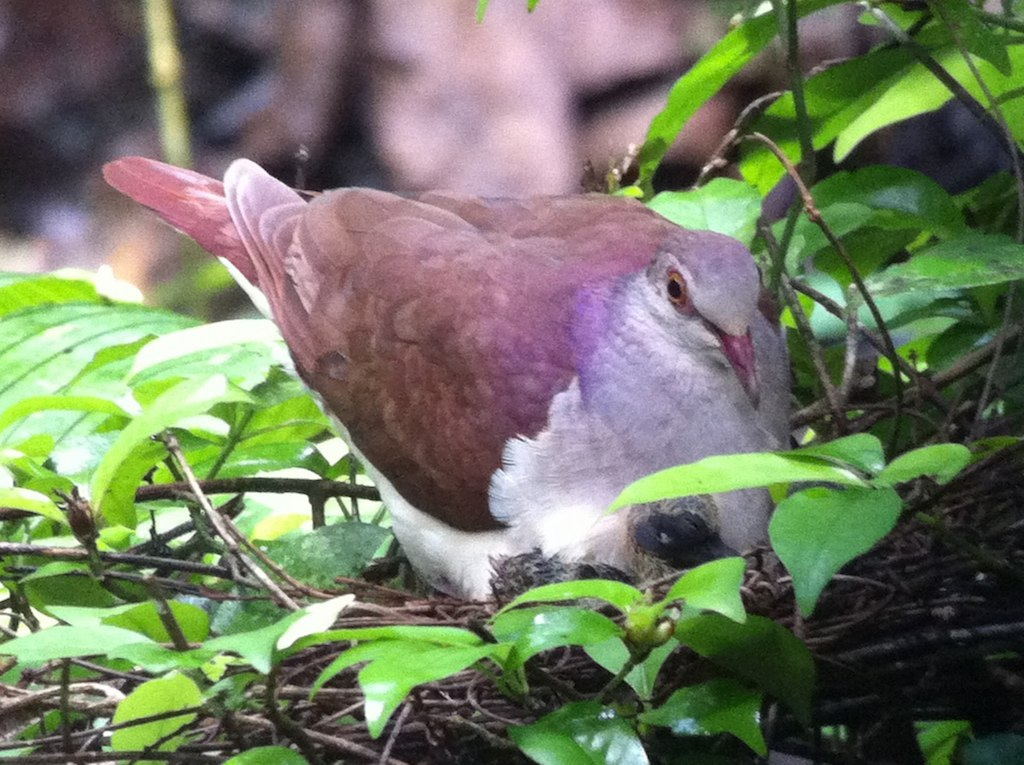

Conservation status
- Least Concern (IUCN 3.1)

Scientific classification
- Kingdom: Animalia
- Phylum: Chordata
- Class: Aves
- Order: Columbiformes
- Family: Columbidae
- Genus: Geotrygon
- Species: G. violacea

Binomial name
- Geotrygon violacea (Temminck, 1809)

Synonyms
- Oreopelaia violacea

= Violaceous quail-dove =

Species of bird

The violaceous quail-dove (Geotrygon violacea) is a species of bird in the family Columbidae. It is found in Argentina, Bolivia, Brazil, Colombia, Costa Rica, Guyana, Nicaragua, Panama, Paraguay, Peru, Suriname, and Venezuela.

== Taxonomy and systematics ==
The violaceous quail-dove and most of what are now the other species in genus Geotrygon were previously in genus Oreopeleia. It has two subspecies, the nominate G. v. violacea and G. v. albiventer.

== Description ==
Male violaceous quail-doves are 20 to 23.5 cm (7.9 to 9.3 in) long and females 21 to 24.5 cm (8.3 to 9.6 in). They weigh 93 to 150 g (3.3 to 5.3 oz). Adult males of the nominate subspecies have a grayish mauve crown, a grayish white face, and an iridescent purple to amethyst hindneck and shoulders. The rest of the upperparts are brown with an iridescent purple wash. The throat and breast are white with a purple tinge, the belly white, and the flanks buff. The eye is yellow-brown to orange-brown. Adult females are duller, with the purple gloss confined to the hindneck and shoulders. Their face and throat is pale gray, the neck and breast brownish with a purple tint, and the eye brown. Juveniles are similar to the female but darker, with no iridescence, and reddish to cinnamon scalloping on the upperparts. G. v. albiventer is bluer than the nominate on the head, breast, and shoulders.

== Distribution and habitat ==
The nominate subspecies of violaceous quail-dove has a discontinuous distribution. It is found in southeastern Colombia; Guyana and Suriname; northeastern Brazil; parts of Peru and Bolivia; and southeastern Brazil, eastern Paraguay, and far northeastern Argentina. G. v. albiventer is found in Nicaragua, Costa Rica, Panama, and through northeastern Colombia to eastern Venezuela. Some seasonal movements are suspected but not documented. It inhabits the undergrowth and understory of tropical evergreen forest, both primary and secondary, and cacao plantations as well. In elevation it ranges up to 1,650 m (5,410 ft).

== Behavior ==
=== Feeding ===
The violaceous quail-dove forages on the ground for seeds, fallen fruits, and probably small invertebrates.

=== Breeding ===
The violaceous quail-dove's breeding season appears to span from March possibly to November, based on the timing of observations of adults in breeding condition, a nest with two eggs, and juveniles. The species builds a stick nest 1 to 2 m (3.3 to 6.6 ft) above the ground.

=== Vocalization ===
The violaceous quail-dove's advertising call is "a repeated, single, rather high-pitched cooing note".

== Status ==
The IUCN has assessed the violaceous quail-dove as being of Least Concern. Though it appears to be rare to uncommon in much of its range, it has a large overall population.
