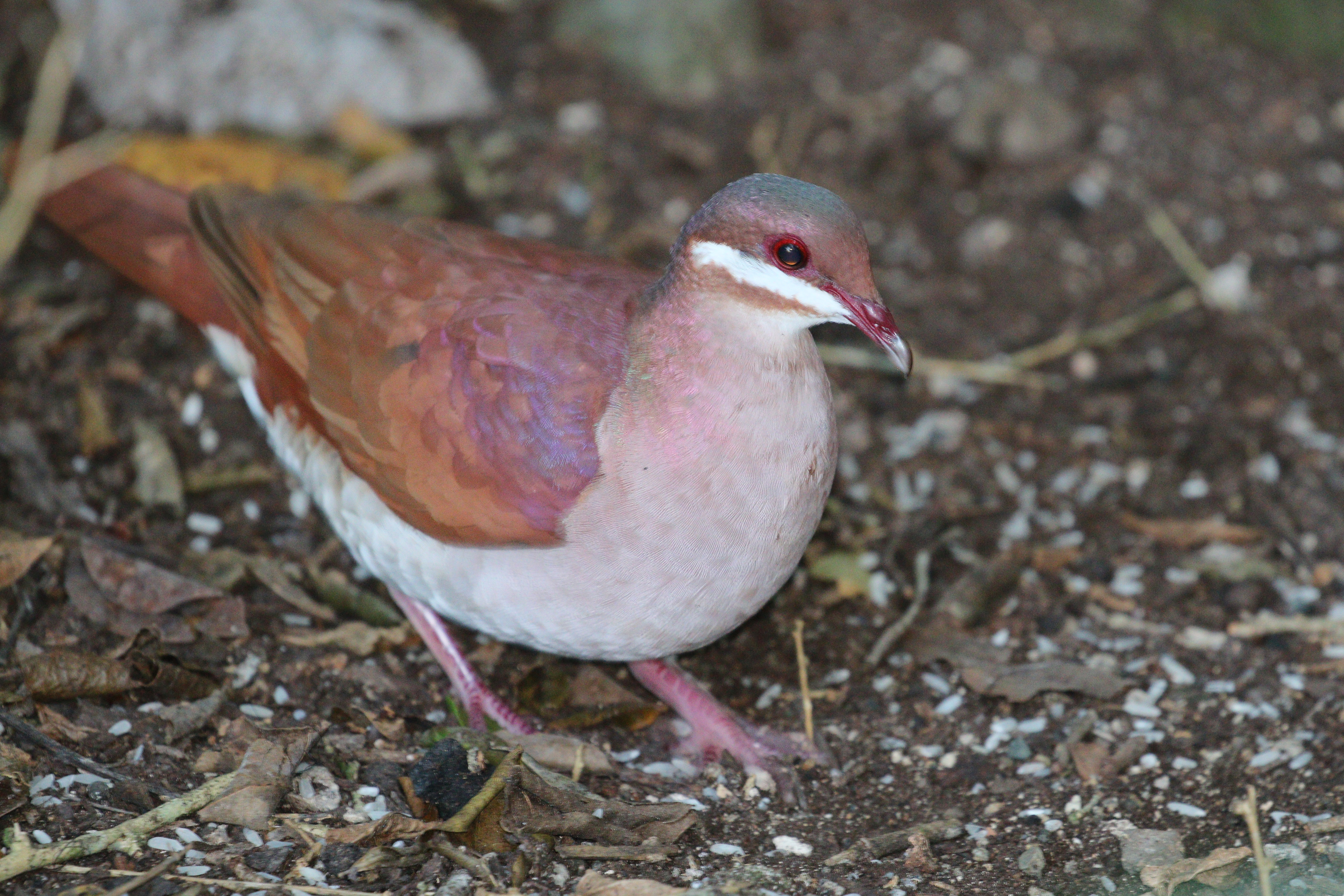
- In Cuba

Conservation status
- Least Concern (IUCN 3.1)

Scientific classification
- Kingdom: Animalia
- Phylum: Chordata
- Class: Aves
- Order: Columbiformes
- Family: Columbidae
- Genus: Geotrygon
- Species: G. chrysia

Binomial name
- Geotrygon chrysia Bonaparte, 1855

= Key West quail-dove =

Species of bird

The Key West quail-dove (Geotrygon chrysia) is a species of bird from the doves and pigeon family Columbidae. It is probably most closely related to the bridled quail-dove.

== Distribution and habitat ==
The Key West quail-dove breeds in the Bahamas and, except for Jamaica, throughout the Greater Antilles. It was once found in the Cayman Islands. Despite its name, it does not currently breed in the Florida Keys and southern mainland Florida.

This bird is found in tropical and subtropical dry forests, shrublands, and lowland moist forests.

== Diet ==
These birds forage on the ground, mainly eating seeds, berries and fallen fruit. It is fond of poisonwood fruit. It will also take snails in its diet.

== Breeding ==
The Key West quail-dove was known to commonly breed in the Florida Keys in the early 1800s, but disappeared from the area in the mid part of that century. However, it occasionally is still recorded in the Keys and southern Florida as a vagrant. It lays two buff-colored eggs on a flimsy platform built on a shrub. Some nests are built on the ground.

== Description ==
The Key West quail-dove is approximately 27–31 cm in length. The bird is distinguished by having a dark rust-colored back and similarly colored wings. It has some amethyst or bronze green iridescence on its crown, nape and in the back of its neck. The mantle, back, rump and inner wing coverts show some purplish red iridescence. It also has a bold white facial stripe. Its call is a single-pitched moan and is similar that of the white-tipped dove.
