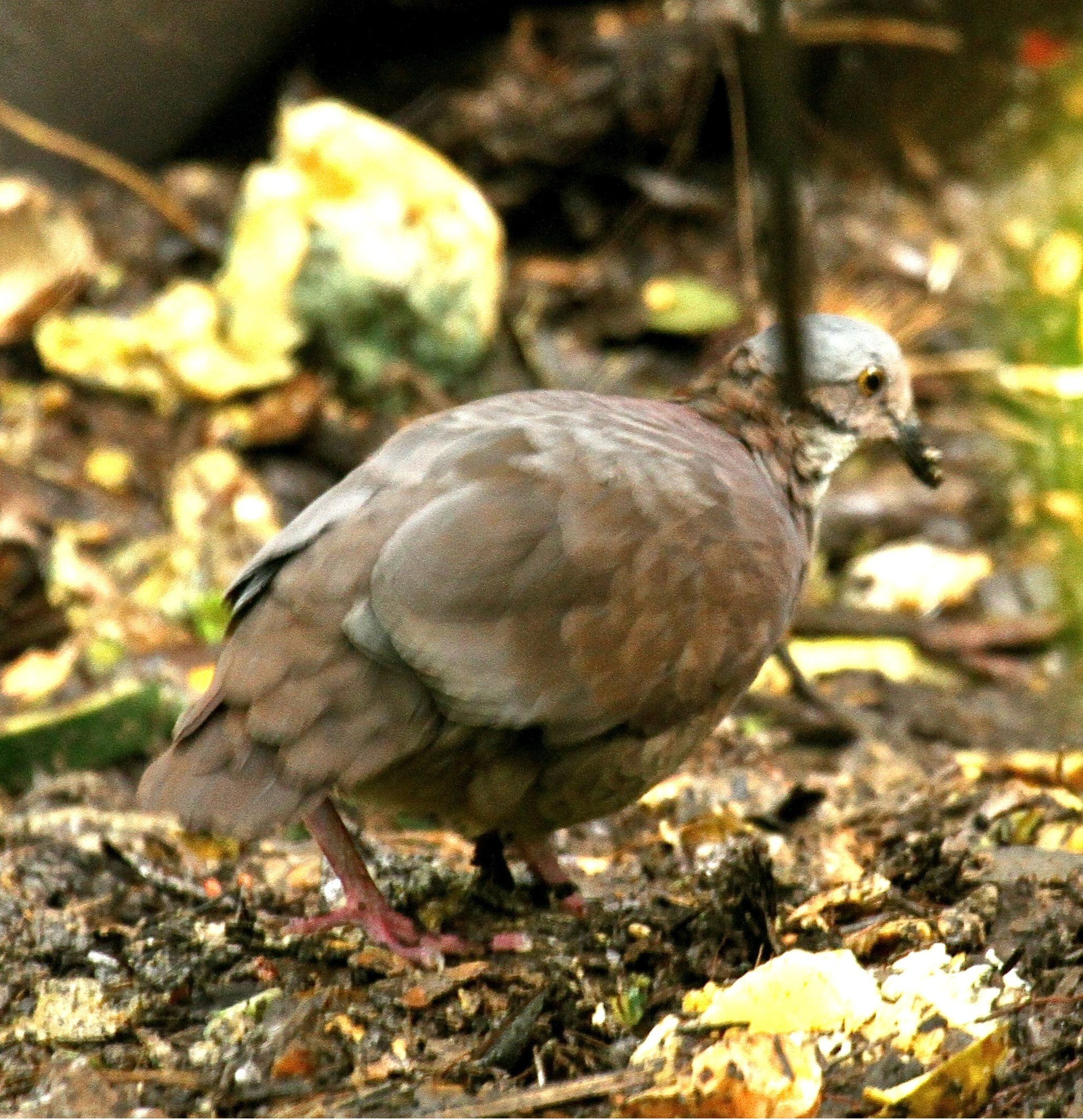
- White-throated quail-dove (Zentrygon frenata)

Scientific classification
- Kingdom: Animalia
- Phylum: Chordata
- Class: Aves
- Order: Columbiformes
- Family: Columbidae
- Subfamily: Columbinae
- Tribe: Zenaidini
- Genus: Zentrygon; Banks et al., 2013

Species
- see text

= Zentrygon =

Genus of birds

Zentrygon is a bird genus in the pigeon and dove family (Columbidae). Its members are called quail-doves and all live in the Neotropics.

The species of this genus primarily range from southern Mexico throughout Central America. Quail-doves are ground-dwelling birds that live, nest, and feed in dense forests. They are remarkable for their purple to brown coloration with light-and-dark facial markings.

The genus was introduced in 2013 with buff-fronted quail-dove as the type species. It contains the following eight species:

- Tuxtla quail-dove or Veracruz quail-dove, Zentrygon carrikeri
- Buff-fronted quail-dove or Costa Rica quail-dove, Zentrygon costaricensis
- Purplish-backed quail-dove, Zentrygon lawrencii
- White-faced quail-dove, Zentrygon albifacies
- White-throated quail-dove, Zentrygon frenata
- Lined quail-dove, Zentrygon linearis
- Chiriqui quail-dove, Zentrygon chiriquensis
- Russet-crowned quail-dove, Zentrygon goldmani

- Zenaidini
  - Geotrygon – 9 species
  - - - Leptotila – 11 species
      - Leptotrygon – olive-backed quail-dove
    - - Zenaida – 7 species
      - Zentrygon – 8 species

Cladogram showing the position of genera in the tribe Zenaidini.
