= Sierra de los Tuxtlas =

Volcanic belt and mountain range in Mexico

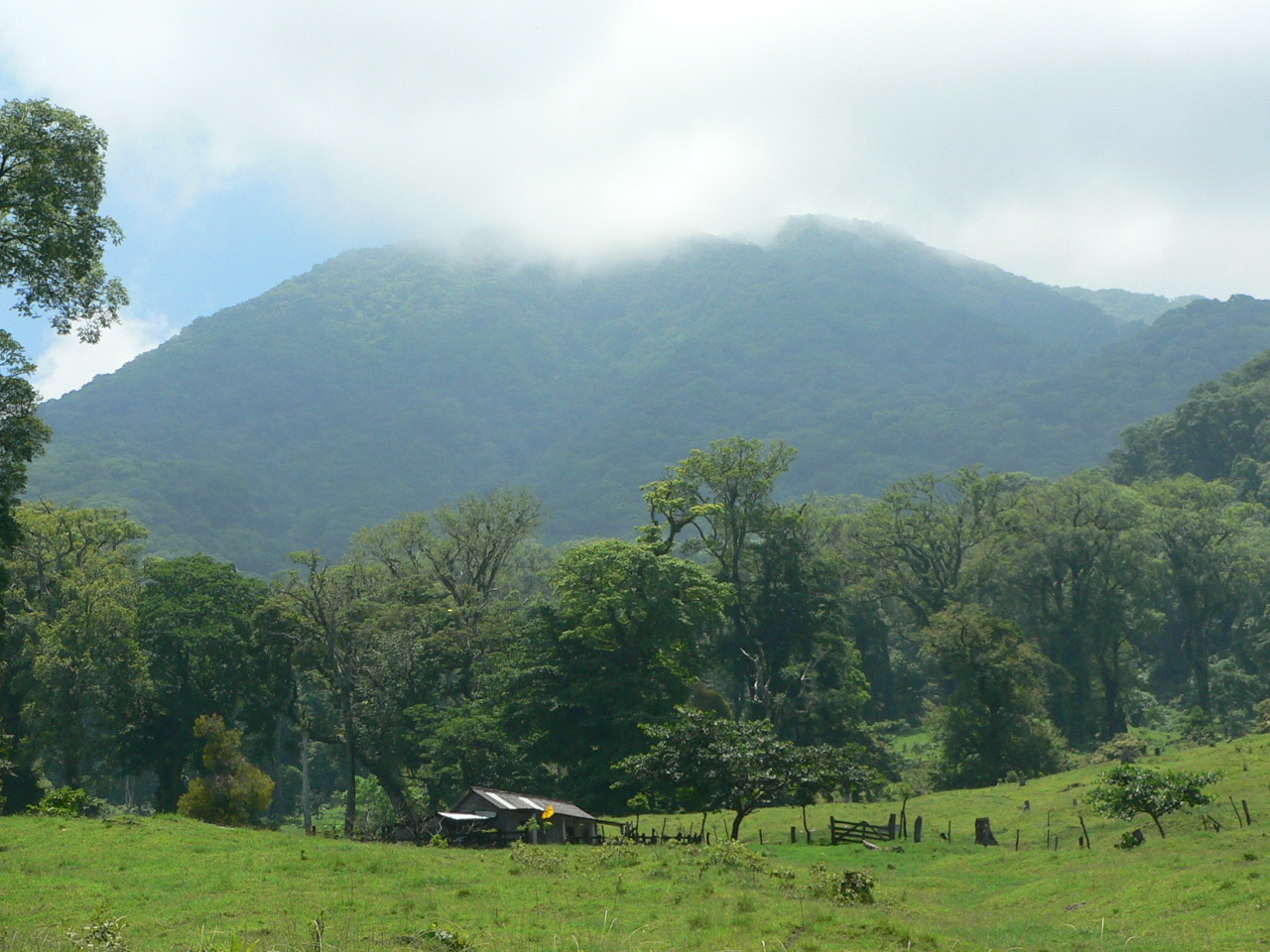
- Cloud-shrouded San Martin Tuxtla

- Location of the Sierra de los Tuxtlas

Ecology
- Realm: Neotropical
- Biome: Tropical and subtropical moist broadleaf forests
- Borders: Petén–Veracruz moist forests

Geography
- Area: 3,813 km^{2} (1,472 mi^{2})
- Country: Mexico
- States: Veracruz
- Coordinates: 18°27′N 94°57′W

Conservation
- Conservation status: Critical/endangered
- Protected: 1,519 km² (40%)

The Sierra de Los Tuxtlas (Tuxtlas Mountains) are a volcanic belt and mountain range along the southeastern Veracruz Gulf coast in Eastern Mexico. The Los Tuxtlas Biosphere Reserve (Biósfera Los Tuxtlas) includes the coastal and higher elevations of the Sierra de Los Tuxtlas.

The volcanic mountains were used as a basalt source by the Olmec culture during the Early Formative period (c. 1500 BCE – c. 400 BCE). Quarried basalt was transported by raft through a network of rivers, to sites in the Olmec heartland for use in creating monuments, including colossal heads.

== Geography ==
Peaks in this range include Volcano Santa Marta and Volcano San Martín Tuxtla, both rising above 1,700 meters. San Martín Tuxtla is the only recently active volcano in the belt, erupting in 1664 and again in May 1793. It is a broad alkaline shield volcano with a one kilometer wide summit. Hundreds of smaller cinder cones are prevalent throughout the Sierra.

Other, extinct volcanoes include San Martin Pajapan (1,160 meters) and Cerro El Vigia (800 meters).

The Sierra de Los Tuxtlas volcanoes are an insular anomaly. The volcanoes are separated from the nearest volcano in the Trans-Mexican Volcanic Belt to the west by about 150 miles (250 km), and from the Central American Volcanic Belt to the southeast by almost 200 miles (330 km).

== Natural history ==
The upper flanks of the San Martin Tuxtla and Santa Marta volcanoes are covered with the Neotropical Sierra de los Tuxtlas tropical rainforest ecoregion, of the tropical and subtropical moist broadleaf forests biome. The lower portions are covered with stunted pastures and grasslands.

The Tuxtla quail-dove (Zentrygon carrikeri) is endemic to the ecoregion.

The Volcan San Martin rainfrog, Craugastor vulcani, is an endangered frog endemic to rain and cloud forests of Sierra de los Tuxtlas. The area is also home to an endemic species of giant scarab beetle, Dynastes moroni, described in 2005.

== See also ==
- List of ecoregions in Mexico
