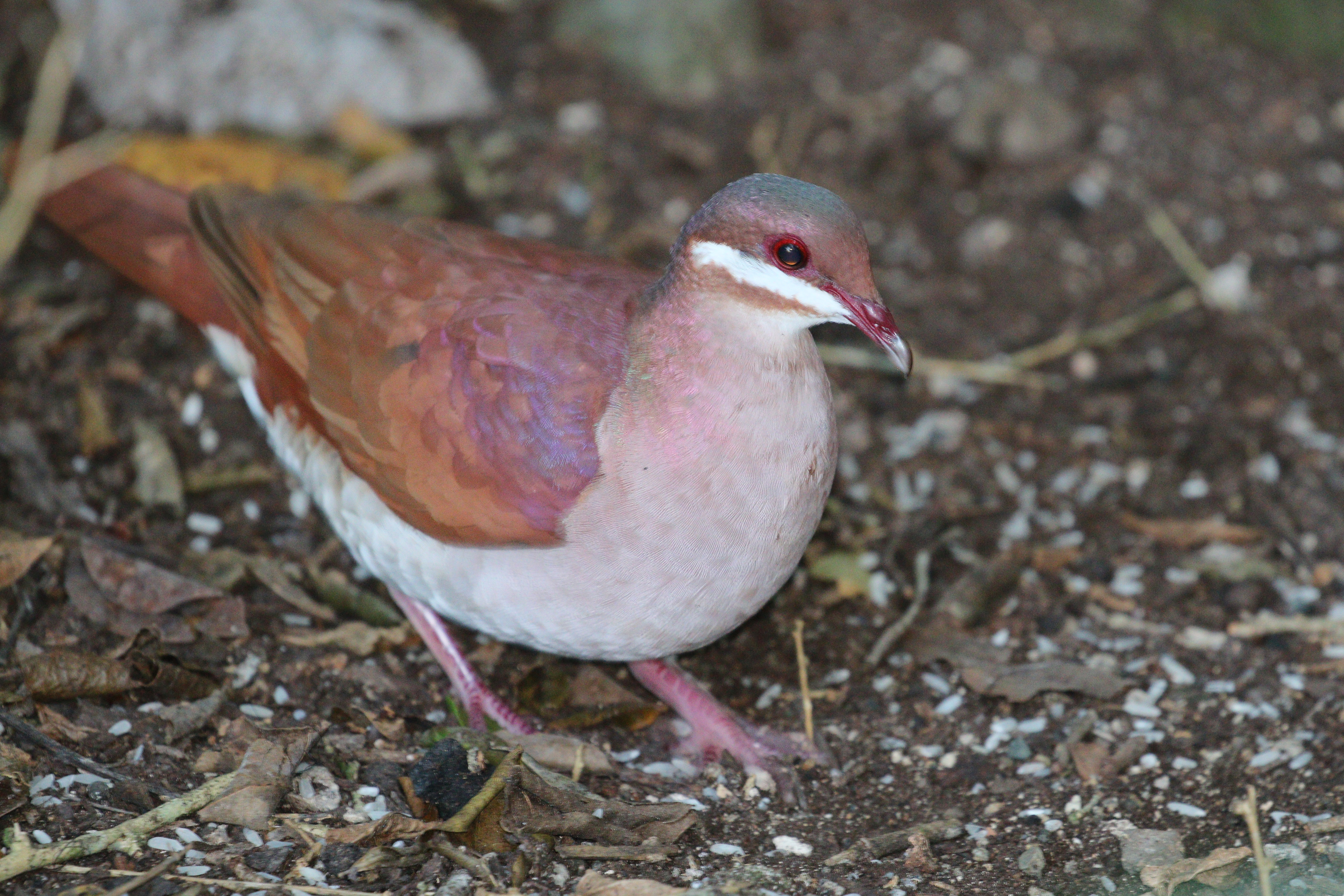
- Key West quail-dove

Scientific classification
- Kingdom: Animalia
- Phylum: Chordata
- Class: Aves
- Order: Columbiformes
- Family: Columbidae
- Subfamily: Columbinae
- Tribe: Zenaidini
- Genus: Geotrygon; Gosse, 1847

Type species
- Columba cristata = Geotrygon versicolor Temminck, 1809

Species
- see text

= Geotrygon =

Genus of birds

Geotrygon is a bird genus in the pigeon and dove family (Columbidae). Its members are called quail-doves, and all live in the Neotropics. The species of this genus have ranges from southern Mexico and Central America to the West Indies and South America, with 2 species recorded as occasional vagrants reported in Texas and Florida in the United States. Quail-doves are ground-dwelling pigeons that live, nest, and feed in dense forests. They are remarkable for their vivid coloration with light-and-dark facial markings.

== Taxonomy ==
The genus Geotrygon was introduced in 1847 by English naturalist Philip Henry Gosse. The name combines the Ancient Greek geō- meaning "ground-" and trygōn meaning "turtledove". The type species was subsequently designated as the crested quail-dove (Geotrygon versicolor).

=== Species ===
The genus contains nine species:

Genus Geotrygon – Gosse, 1847 – nine species
Common name	Scientific name and subspecies	Range	Size and ecology	IUCN status and estimated population
Grey-fronted quail-dove	Geotrygon caniceps (Gundlach, 1852)	Cuba	Size: Habitat: Diet:	VU
Key West quail-dove	Geotrygon chrysia Bonaparte, 1855	Bahamas. southern Florida, Greater Antilles	Size: Habitat: Diet:	LC
White-fronted quail-dove or Hispaniolan quail-dove	Geotrygon leucometopia (Chapman, 1917)	Dominican Republic	Size: Habitat: Diet:	EN
Ruddy quail-dove	Geotrygon montana (Linnaeus, 1758) Two subspecies: G. m. martinica (Linnaeus, 1766); G. m. montana (Linnaeus, 1758)	the West Indies, Central America, and tropical South America	Size: Habitat: Diet:	LC
Bridled quail-dove	Geotrygon mystacea (Temminck, 1811)	Saint Lucia in the Lesser Antilles north and west to Puerto Rico	Size: Habitat: Diet:	LC
Purple quail-dove	Geotrygon purpurata (Salvin, 1878)	Colombia and Ecuador	Size: Habitat: Diet:	EN
Sapphire quail-dove	Geotrygon saphirina Bonaparte, 1855	Brazil, Colombia, Ecuador, and Peru.	Size: Habitat: Diet:	LC
Crested quail-dove	Geotrygon versicolor (Lafresnaye, 1846)	Jamaica	Size: Habitat: Diet:	NT
Violaceous quail-dove	Geotrygon violacea (Temminck, 1809) Two subspecies: G. v. violacea (Temminck, 1809); G. v. albiventer Lawrence, 1865	Argentina, Bolivia, Brazil, Colombia, Costa Rica, Guyana, Nicaragua, Panama, Paraguay, Peru, Suriname, and Venezuela.	Size: Habitat: Diet:	LC

Fossils

- †Puerto Rican quail-dove, Geotrygon larva - prehistoric

Members of the genera Zentrygon and Leptotrygon are also known as quail-doves, and were formerly included in Geotrygon. The Cuban species Starnoenas cyanocephala was previously referred to as a quail-dove, though this English name is no longer used.

- Zenaidini
  - Geotrygon – 9 species
  - - - Leptotila – 11 species
      - Leptotrygon – olive-backed quail-dove
    - - Zenaida – 7 species
      - Zentrygon – 8 species

Cladogram showing the position of genera in the tribe Zenaidini.
