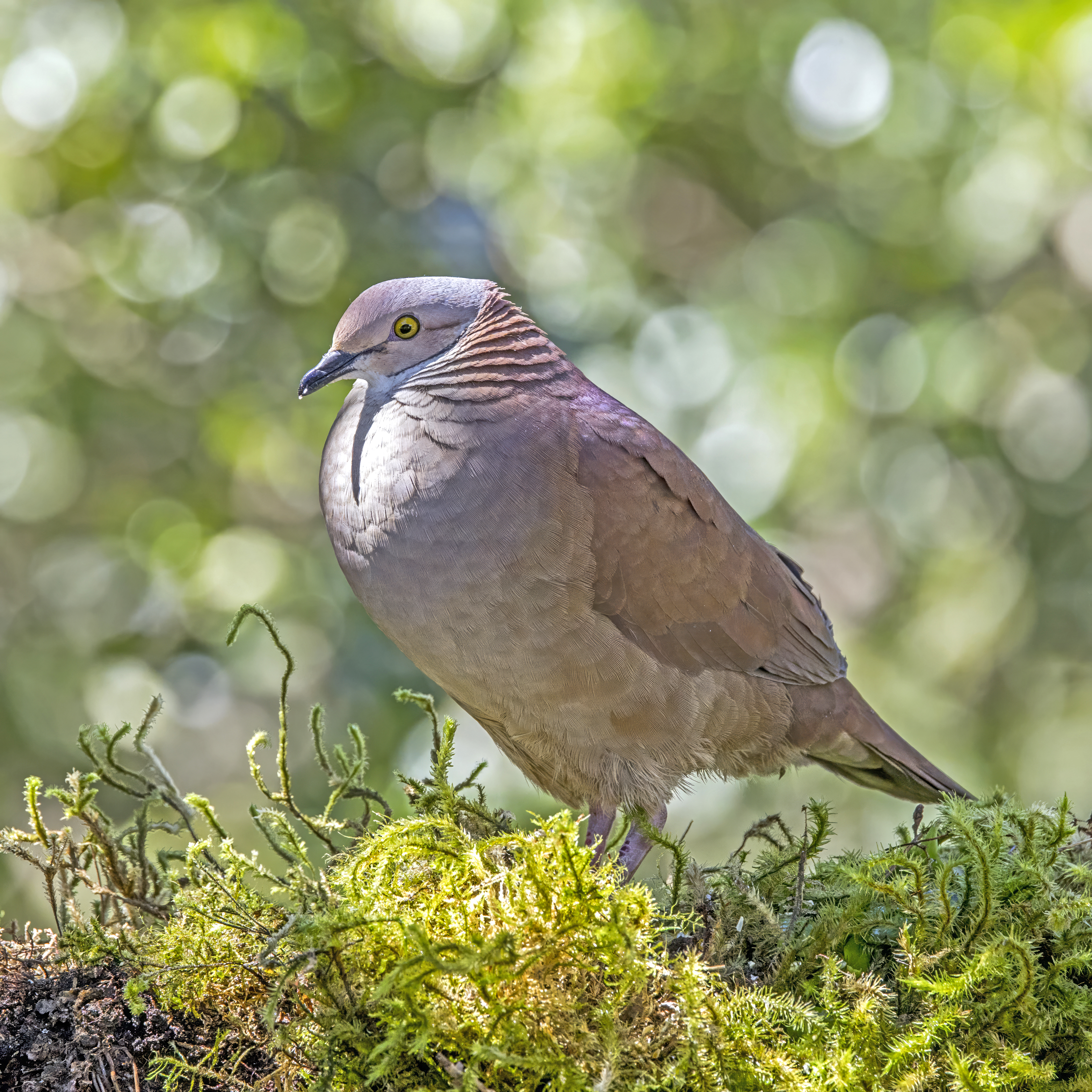
- Zentrygon frenata bourcieri, Colombia

Conservation status
- Least Concern (IUCN 3.1)

Scientific classification
- Kingdom: Animalia
- Phylum: Chordata
- Class: Aves
- Order: Columbiformes
- Family: Columbidae
- Genus: Zentrygon
- Species: Z. frenata

Binomial name
- Zentrygon frenata (Tschudi, 1843)

Synonyms
- Geotrygon frenata; Oreopeleia bourcieri

= White-throated quail-dove =

Species of bird

The white-throated quail-dove (Zentrygon frenata) is a species of bird in the family Columbidae. It is found in Argentina, Bolivia, Colombia, Ecuador, and Peru.

== Taxonomy and systematics ==
The white-throated quail-dove's taxonomic history is complicated. It was originally described in genus Geotrygon, later erroneously given the binomial Oreopeleia bourcieri, and still later attained its present binomial. The four subspecies below are currently recognized. Z. f. boucieri was at one time treated as separate species by some authors. Additional subspecies have been proposed but are now generally accepted as color morphs or individual variations of one of the four accepted subspecies.

The white-throated quail-dove has these four subspecies:

- Z. f. frenata (Tschudi, 1843)
- Z. f. bourcieri (Bonaparte, 1855)
- Z. f. subgrisea (Chapman, 1922)
- Z. f. margaritae (Blake, Hoy, G, & Contino, F, 1961)

== Description ==
The white-throated quail-dove is 30 to 34 cm (12 to 13 in) long and weighs about 311 g (11 oz), making it among the largest quail-doves. The adult nominate subspecies Z. f. frenata male's forehead and the lower part of the face are buff and the crown blue-gray. The mantle is deep purple and the rest of the upperparts reddish brown. The throat is white, the breast gray, and the belly and flanks dark buff. Females are browner rather than gray; juveniles are similar to the female with the addition of dark barring on both the upper and underparts. The other subspecies differ somewhat in the colors of their heads.

== Distribution and habitat ==
The subspecies of white-throated quail-dove are found from north to south thus:

- Z. f. bourcieri - western Colombia and western and eastern Ecuador
- Z. f. subgrisea - southwestern Ecuador and northwestern Peru
- Z. f. frenata - northern Peru to central Bolivia
- Z. f. margaritae - southern Bolivia and far northwestern Argentina

They inhabit humid evergreen montane forest in the Andes, usually between 900 and 3,000 m (3,000 and 9,800 ft) but sometimes as low as 700 m (2,300 ft).

== Behavior ==
=== Feeding ===
The white-throated quail-dove forages on the ground, usually alone but sometimes with one or two other birds. Its diet has not been documented.

=== Breeding ===
The white-throated quail-dove's breeding season appears to vary across its range. One documented nest was a flat platform placed 2 m (7 ft) above the ground in a tangle of vegetation; it contained one egg. A second nest was also a platform, made of tightly packed dry twigs placed on a horizontal branch fork about 3 to 4 m (10 to 13 ft) above the ground. At its discovery an adult was on the nest apparently incubating an egg or eggs. Later observations showed two adults exchanging places on the nest. Essentially nothing else is known about the species' breeding biology.

=== Vocalization ===
The white-throated quail-dove's song is "a single monotonous low-pitched note 'whoOOo', with highest amplitude in the middle."

== Status ==
The IUCN has assessed the white-throated quail-dove as being of Least Concern. Its population is suspected to be stable but has not been quantified. Little is known about its biology and ecology and it appears to be patchily distributed.
