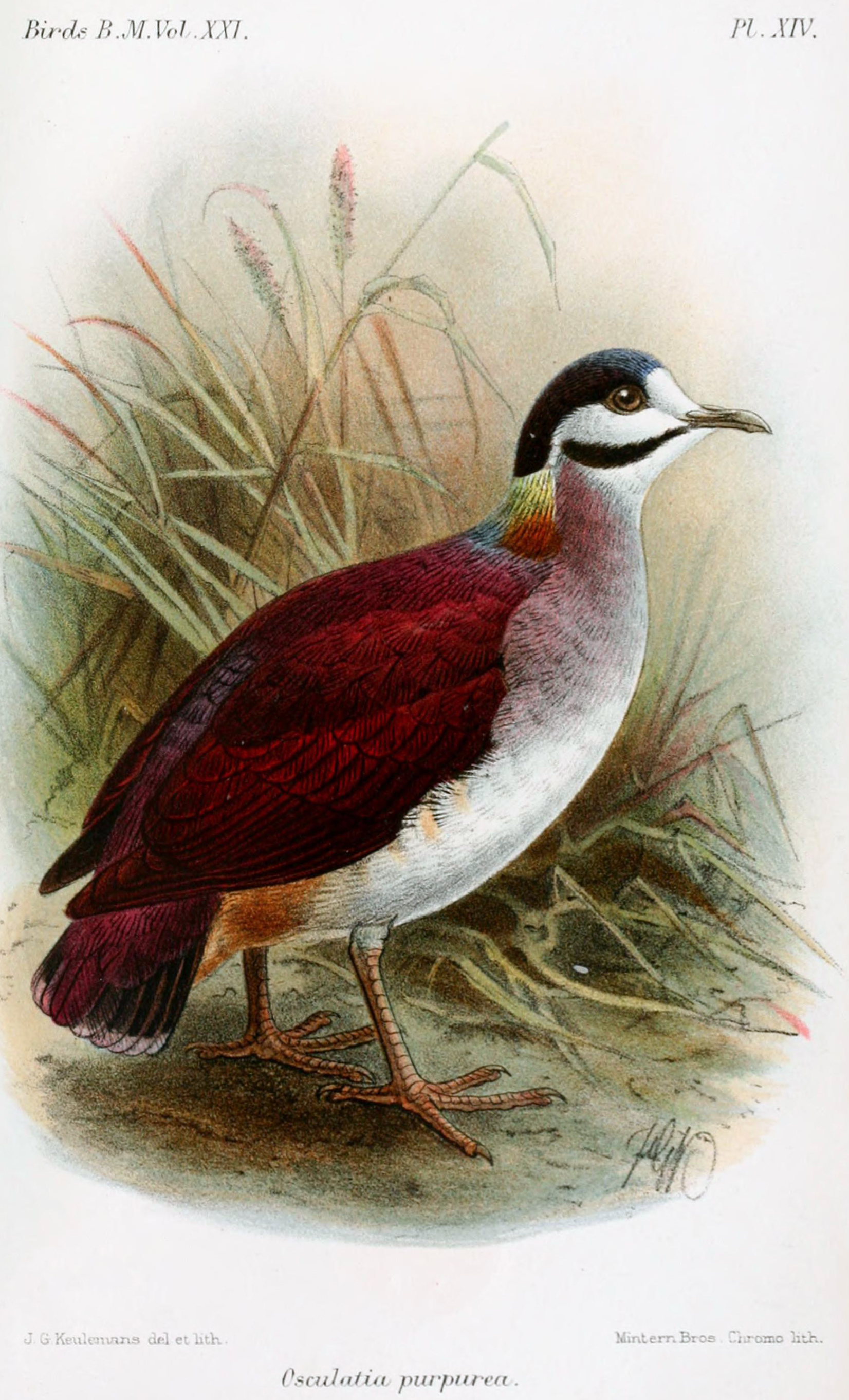

Conservation status
- Endangered (IUCN 3.1)

Scientific classification
- Domain: Eukaryota
- Kingdom: Animalia
- Phylum: Chordata
- Class: Aves
- Order: Columbiformes
- Family: Columbidae
- Genus: Geotrygon
- Species: G. purpurata

Binomial name
- Geotrygon purpurata (Salvin, 1878)

Synonyms
- Osculatia saphirina purpurata

= Purple quail-dove =

Species of bird

The purple quail-dove (Geotrygon purpurata) is a species of bird in the family Columbidae. It is found in Colombia and Ecuador.

== Taxonomy and systematics ==
The purple quail-dove was at one time considered a subspecies of sapphire quail-dove, now Geotrygon saphirina but then named Osculatia saphirina. Since the early 2010s it has been treated as a separate species.

== Description ==
The purple quail-dove is 22 to 26 cm (8.7 to 10.2 in) long and weighs about 155 g (5.5 oz). The adult male has reddish-brown upperparts with a purplish wash, rich reddish purple wing coverts, and bright ultramarine back and rump. The tail is blackish with white tips on the outer three feathers. The underparts are grayish white. The head has an intricate pattern of indigo crown and nape, mostly white face and throat, a blackish purple malar stripe, and iridescent golden green sides of the neck. The eyes are pale red surrounded by bare black skin. The adult female is duller than the male and the upperparts are a less rich red-brown. Juveniles are even duller, with a less distinct facial pattern, buffy markings on the upperparts, and no iridescence.

== Distribution and habitat ==
The purple quail-dove is found from northwestern Colombia south to northwestern Ecuador. It inhabits the ground and undergrowth of primary and older secondary evergreen montane forest. In Colombia it ranges from 200 to 1,100 m (660 to 3,610 ft) in elevation but only up to 700 m (2,300 ft) in Ecuador.

== Behavior ==
=== Feeding ===
The purple quail-dove forages on the ground, singly or in pairs. Its diet has not been documented but it probably eats seeds and small invertebrates like other quail-doves.

=== Breeding ===
A male purple quail-dove with enlarged testes was taken in Ecuador in June, but no other information about its breeding phenology is known.

=== Vocalization ===
The purple quail-dove's song is "a sustained series of soft, hollow coos, 'whot, WHOO-OO-OIT'."

== Status ==
The IUCN has assessed the purple quail-dove as Endangered. "This species has a very small population...and which is inferred to be undergoing a moderately low continuing decline owing to the combined effects of habitat loss and degradation."
