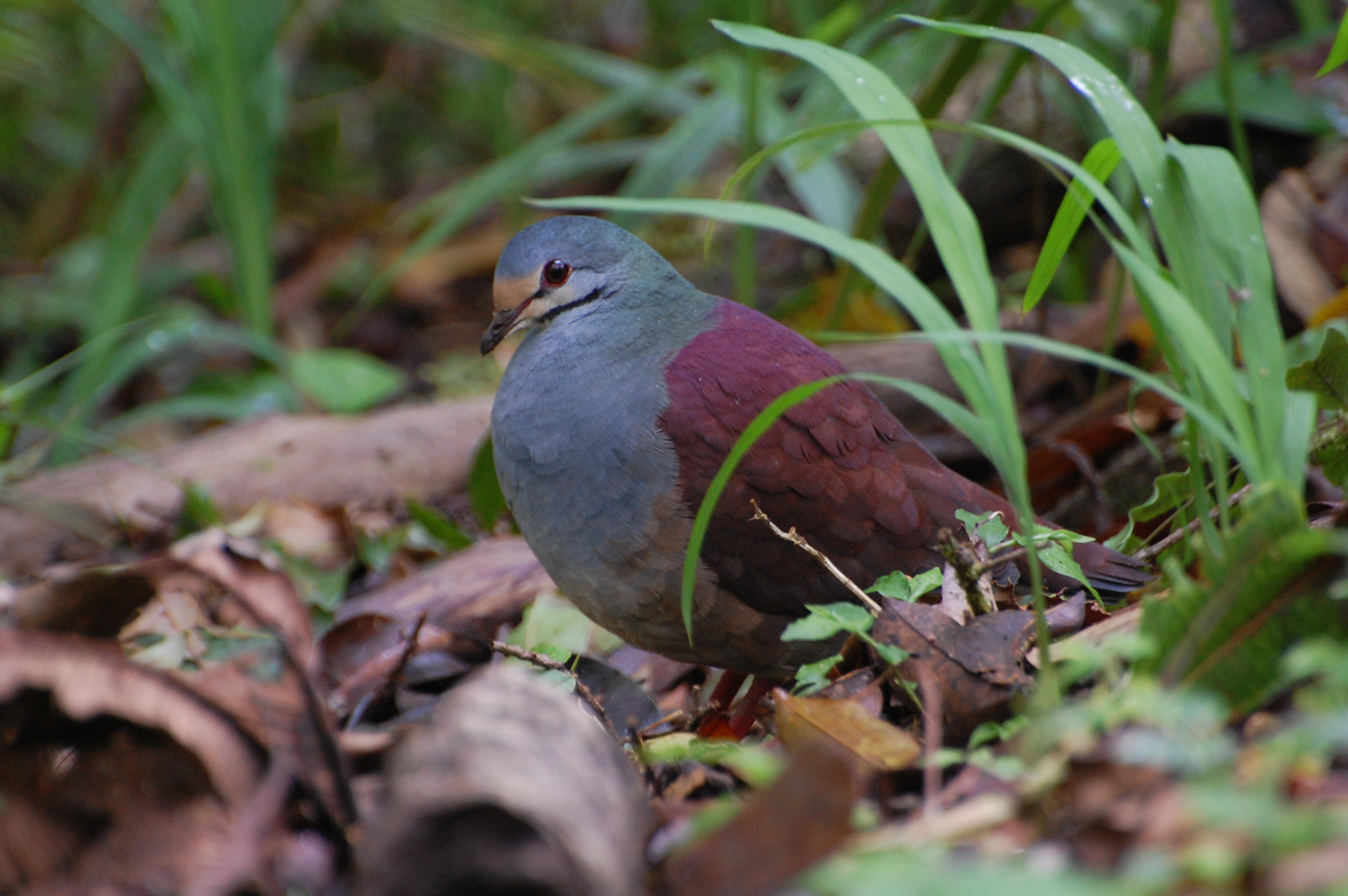

Conservation status
- Least Concern (IUCN 3.1)

Scientific classification
- Kingdom: Animalia
- Phylum: Chordata
- Class: Aves
- Order: Columbiformes
- Family: Columbidae
- Genus: Zentrygon
- Species: Z. costaricensis

Binomial name
- Zentrygon costaricensis (Lawrence, 1868)

Synonyms
- Geotrygon costaricensis; Oreopeleia costaricensis

= Buff-fronted quail-dove =

Species of bird

The buff-fronted quail-dove (Zentrygon costaricensis) or Costa Rican quail-dove, is a species of bird in the family Columbidae. It is native to the Talamancan montane forests.

== Taxonomy and systematics ==
The buff-fronted quail-dove was originally described in genus Geotrygon, later placed in genus Oreopeleia, and still later in its present Zentrygon. Its relationships with the other members of its genus have not been fully resolved. The buff-fronted quail-dove is monotypic.

== Description ==
The buff-fronted quail-dove is 24 to 28 cm (9.4 to 11.0 in) long. Two males weighed 310 and 330 g (11 and 12 oz) and two females 225 and 283 g (7.9 and 10.0 oz). The adult's head, neck, and breast are medium gray, the nape and upper back have a green tinge while the belly grades to brownish. The back, wings and tail are maroon. The head has a distinct pattern of light gray cheeks bordered above and below by narrow black stripes that extend just past the eye, as well as the namesake buffy forehead ("front"). The eye is brown surrounded by a slim but noticeable red ring, the legs are bright coral-red, and the bill is dull brown with a reddish cast at the base. The juvenile's crown and nape are dusky gray with a green gloss. Its upperparts are dull chestnut with indistinct dusky bars and cinnamon tips to the feathers. Its underparts have gray and cinnamon bars and freckles and the belly is buff.

== Distribution and habitat ==
The buff-fronted quail-dove is a year-round resident from northern Costa Rica's Cordillera de Guanacaste southeast into western Panama as far as Veraguas Province. It inhabits the Talamancan montane forest ecoregion. In elevation it ranges from 1,000 to 3,000 m (3,300 to 9,800 ft) in Costa Rica and from 1,200 to 3,000 m (3,900 to 9,800 ft) in Panama.

== Behavior ==
=== Feeding ===
The buff-fronted quail-dove forages alone or in pairs, searching leaf litter on the forest floor. Its diet is not well known but includes fruit, seeds, and probably insects.

=== Breeding ===
Little is known about the buff-fronted quail-dove's breeding phenology. The one described nest was a nearly flat platform made of coarse twigs, moss, and liverworts. It was almost 4 m (13 ft) above the ground on a horizontal branch of a tall shrub and contained one nestling.

=== Vocalization ===
The buff-fronted quail-dove's song is "a low, hollow hoOOOO", louder towards the end and with a slightly rising inflection".

== Status ==
The IUCN has assessed the buff-fronted quail-dove as being of Least Concern. Though it has a relatively small range, it is fairly common in it and its population appears to be stable.
