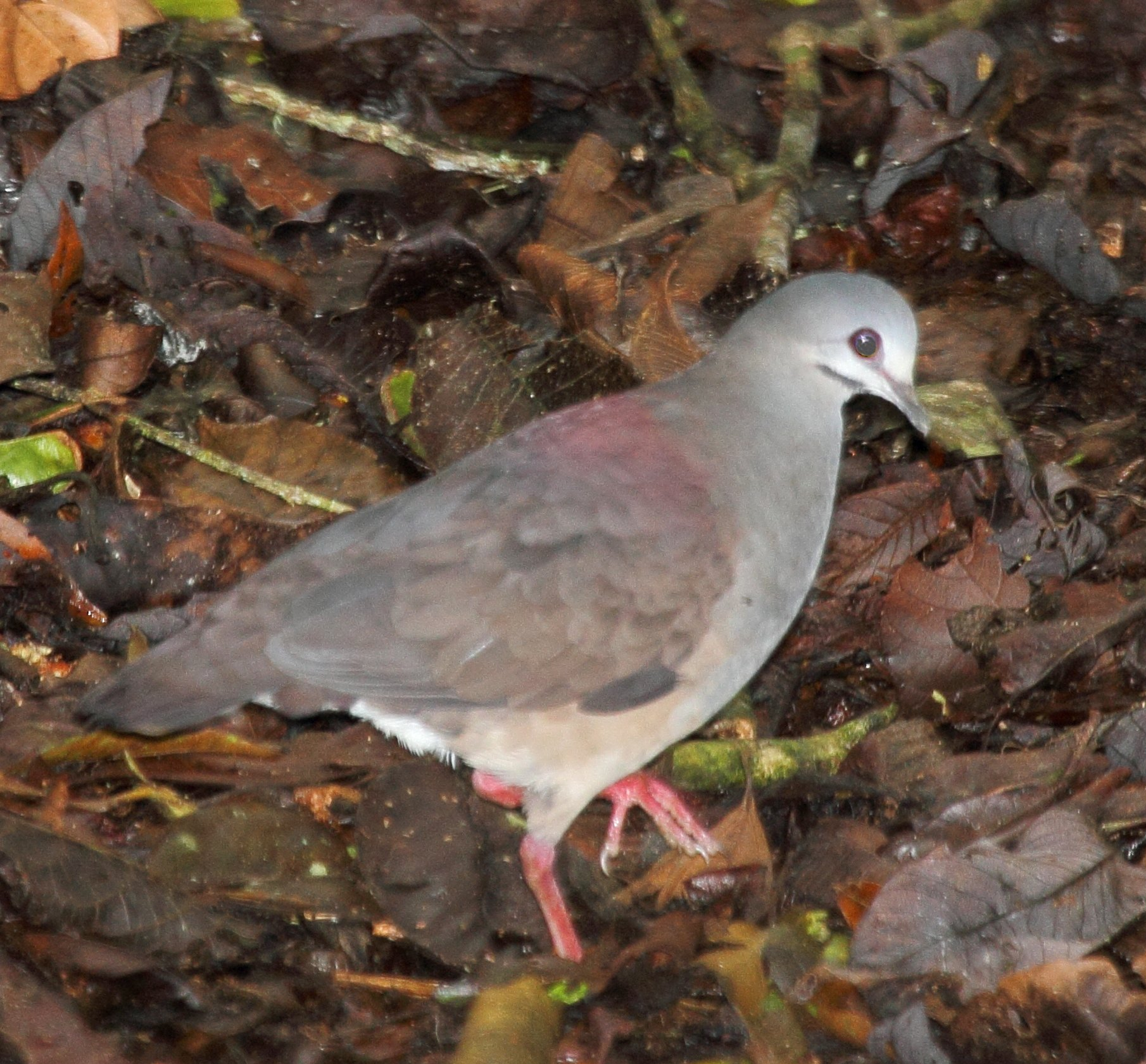

Conservation status
- Least Concern (IUCN 3.1)

Scientific classification
- Kingdom: Animalia
- Phylum: Chordata
- Class: Aves
- Order: Columbiformes
- Family: Columbidae
- Genus: Zentrygon
- Species: Z. lawrencii

Binomial name
- Zentrygon lawrencii (Salvin, 1874)

Synonyms
- Geotrygon lawrencii

= Purplish-backed quail-dove =

Species of bird

The purplish-backed quail-dove (Zentrygon lawrencii) is a species of bird in the family Columbidae. It is found in Costa Rica and Panama.

== Taxonomy and systematics ==
The purplish-backed quail-dove is monotypic. However, the population of it in northwestern Costa Rica was at one time considered a subspecies. The purplish-backed quail-dove and the Tuxtla quail-dove (Zentrygon carrikeri) of Mexico were previously considered conspecific.

== Description ==
Male purplish-backed quail-doves are 26 to 27 cm (10 to 11 in) long and females are about 25 cm (9.8 in) long. The species weighs about 220 g (7.8 oz). Adults have a grayish white forehead and a bluish to greenish gray crown, nape, and hindneck. The mantle is dull purple and the rest of the upperparts and the wings are olive-brown to blackish brown with some reddish tinge. The central tail feathers are purple-brown and the outer ones blackish with gray tips. The face and throat are white with a black malar line and a line from the bill to the eye. The neck and breast are slate gray with greenish sides, the belly center pale buff to cinnamon, and the flanks chocolate. The eye is browish orange to red surrounded by bare magenta skin. The legs and feet are also magenta. The juvenile lacks the green and purple of the mantle, its facial pattern is less conspicuous, and most feathers have buff fringes.

== Distribution and habitat ==
The purplish-backed quail-dove is resident from the Cordillera de Guanacaste in northern Costa Rica southeast to central Panama with scattered populations from there to Darién Province. It inhabits cool, wet, dense montane forest. In elevation it ranges from 400 to 800 m (1,300 to 2,600 ft) on the Caribbean slope but as high as 2,600 m (8,500 ft) in some other areas.

== Behavior ==
=== Movement ===
The purplish-backed quail-dove usually walks or runs from danger rather than flying, though it sometimes will fly to an elevated perch.

=== Feeding ===
The purplish-backed quail-dove forages on the ground, usually singly or in pairs. It feeds on fruit, seeds, insects, and worms.

=== Breeding ===
The purplish-backed quail-dove's breeding season in Costa Rica spans from June to October but apparently starts earlier in Panama. It builds a bulky but loose nest as a shallow bowl of sticks lined with finer materials and places it in dense vegetation near the ground. It lays a single egg.

=== Vocalization ===
The purplish-backed quail-dove's song is a "three-syllable note 'pum-wha-huUUu', with a clear emphasis on the last syllable." The last syllable is all that is usually heard at a distance.

== Status ==
The IUCN has assessed the purplish-backed quail-dove as being of Least Concern. Though it appears to be fairly common, it "could become threatened if forest habitat continues to be destroyed at present rates".
