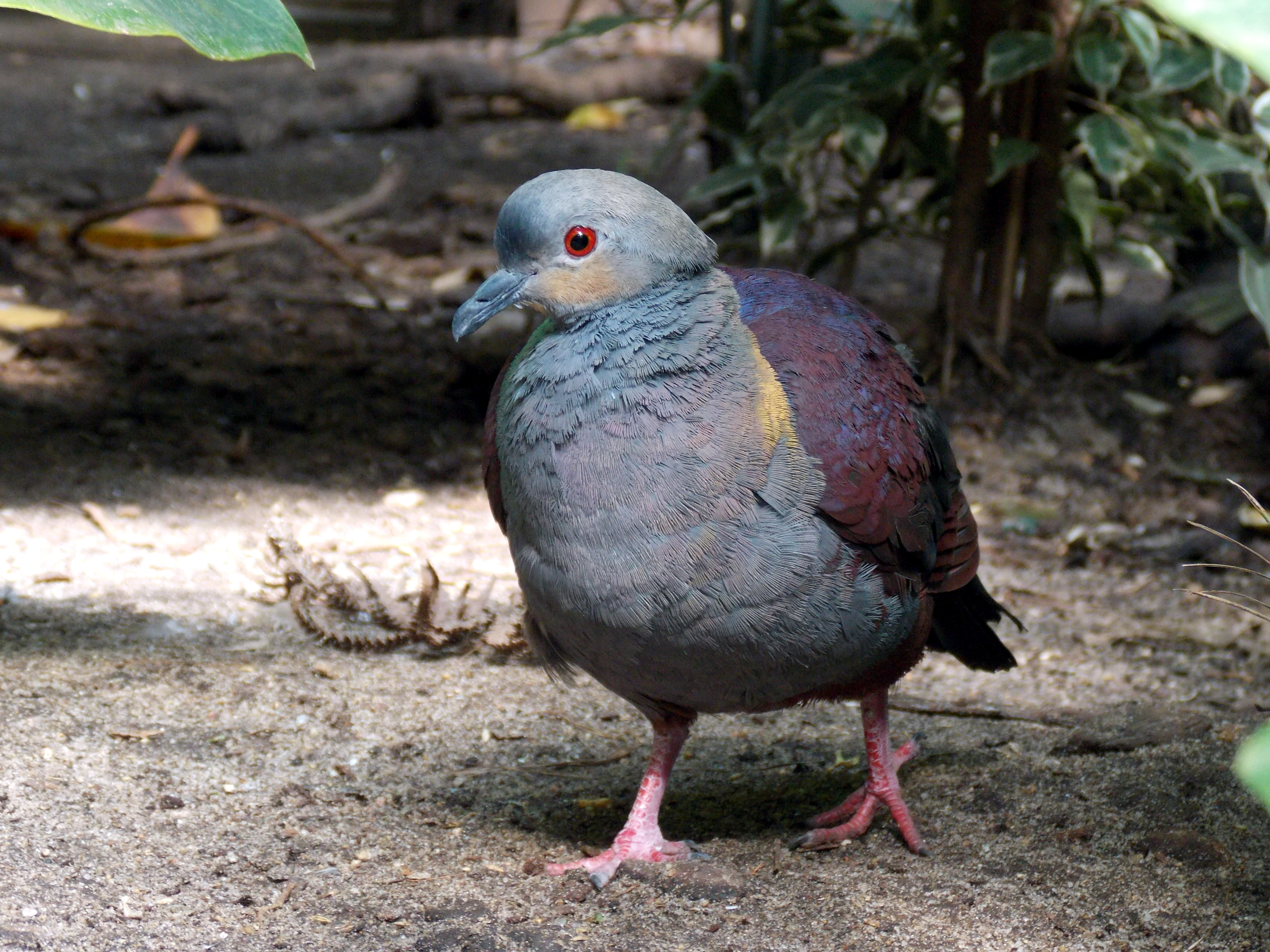
- at Walsrode World Bird Park, Germany

Conservation status
- Near Threatened (IUCN 3.1)

Scientific classification
- Kingdom: Animalia
- Phylum: Chordata
- Class: Aves
- Order: Columbiformes
- Family: Columbidae
- Genus: Geotrygon
- Species: G. versicolor

Binomial name
- Geotrygon versicolor (Lafresnaye, 1846)

= Crested quail-dove =

Species of bird

The crested quail-dove (Geotrygon versicolor) is a species of bird in the family Columbidae. It is endemic to Jamaica.

== Taxonomy and systematics ==
At one time the crested quail-dove was the sole member of genus Geotrygon. Most of what are now the other species in the genus were previously in genus Oreopeleia, which was merged into Geotrygon. The crested quail-dove is monotypic.

== Description ==
Male crested quail-doves are 27 to 31 cm (11 to 12 in) long; females are 27 to 30 cm (11 to 12 in). They weigh about 225 g (7.9 oz). Males have a black forehead and a drab brown crown. The nape is gray and has elongated feathers producing the eponymous crest. The back and sides of the neck are metallic bronze or bronze-green. The face is mostly gray with a broad reddish buff malar stripe. The gray continues to the belly; the belly and flanks are chestnut. The upper back and wing coverts are iridescent reddish purple, the mid-back bluish purple, and the lower back and tail greenish black with purple iridescence. The eye is red, surrounded by bare gray skin. Many females look the same as the male, but sometimes they are paler overall and browner on the neck and belly. Juveniles are duller than the adults and most feathers show rust-colored edges.

== Distribution and habitat ==
The crested quail-dove is endemic to Jamaica. It is concentrated in the Blue and John Crow Mountains, the Mount Diablo area, and the Cockpit Country. It inhabits mid-level and montane forest in those areas, at elevations as low as 100 m (330 ft) in Cockpit Country and as high as 1,800 m (5,900 ft) elsewhere. It shuns the lowland, dry forest, and cultivated woodlands.

== Behavior ==
=== Feeding ===
The crested quail-dove forages in leaf litter on the forest floor for seeds, fallen fruit, and probably invertebrates.

=== Breeding ===
The crested quail-dove's breeding season spans from March to June. It places its nest of twigs near the ground in vegetation or sometimes on the ground. The clutch size is two.

=== Vocalization ===
The crested quail-dove's advertising call is "a short phrase of usually two cooing notes repeated at intervals...'whuuOh..whuuw'."

== Status ==
The IUCN has assessed the crested quail-dove as Near Threatened. Its population is thought to be declining as its habitat is replaced by agriculture and human development. "Since this is a forest species, its survival will depend on the preservation of forests."
