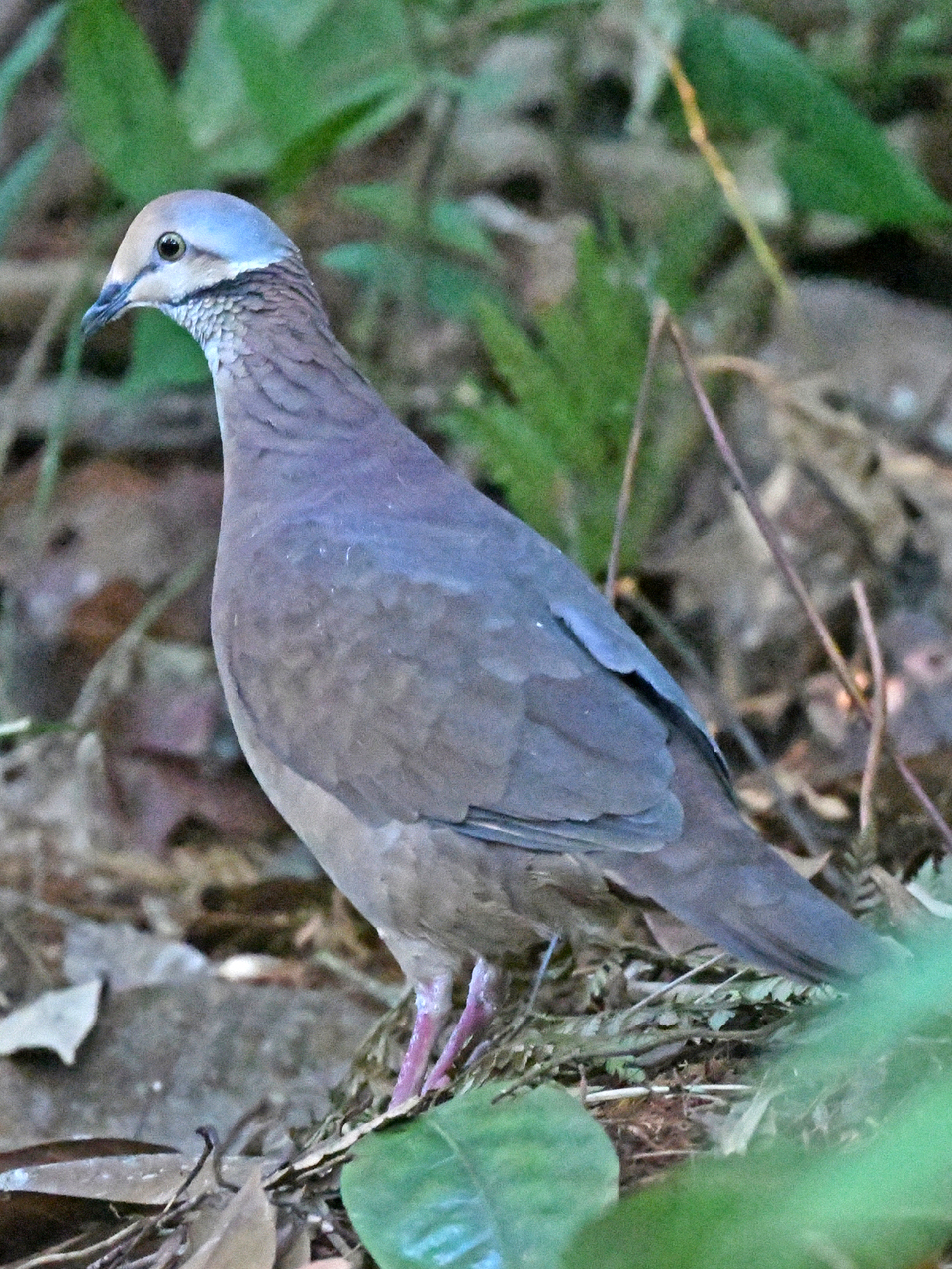

Conservation status
- Least Concern (IUCN 3.1)

Scientific classification
- Kingdom: Animalia
- Phylum: Chordata
- Class: Aves
- Order: Columbiformes
- Family: Columbidae
- Genus: Zentrygon
- Species: Z. linearis

Binomial name
- Zentrygon linearis (Prévost, 1843)

Synonyms
- Geotrygon linearis

= Lined quail-dove =

Species of bird

The lined quail-dove (Zentrygon linearis) is a species of bird in the family Columbidae. It is found in Colombia, Trinidad and Tobago, and Venezuela.

== Taxonomy and systematics ==
The lined quail-dove's taxonomic history is complex. It was originally placed in genus Geotrygon. It, the white-faced quail-dove (Z. albifacies), and the Chiriqui quail-dove (Z. chiriquensis) have been treated as a superspecies or even as conspecific. It has two subspecies, the nominate Zentrygon linearis linearis and A. l. trinitatis. The population of the nominate in Colombia's Sierra Nevada de Santa Marta has been proposed as a separate subspecies. A. l. trinitatis has been treated as a separate species by some authors, and the mainland population of it has been proposed to be split as separate subspecies.

== Description ==
The lined quail-dove is 27 to 29 cm (11 to 11 in) long and weighs 230 to 284 g (8.1 to 10.0 oz). Adult males have a pinkish buff forehead that darkens to purplish brown on the crown. There is a pale gray arc from the eye to the nape and the cheeks are buffy. A thin dark stripe goes from the bill through the eye and another in the malar area. The mantle is reddish purple and the rest of the upperparts reddish brown with purple or bronze-green iridescence on the hindneck. Loose feathers on the sides of the neck give the impression of dark furrows. The breast is pale gray to brownish gray and its sides are purple. The belly and flanks are buffy fawn. The eye can be various shades of yellow to orange-red; it has a narrow red ring and is surrounded by bare blue skin. The legs and feet are red. Females are almost identical to males with the addition of a brownish tinge to the gray breast. Juveniles have overall redder plumage with numerous brown and blackish bars.

== Distribution and habitat ==
The nominate subspecies of lined quail-dove is found in Colombia's Sierra Nevada de Santa Marta, the Andes of Colombia and Venezuela, and Venezuelan coastal mountain ranges. A. l. trinitatis is found in Venezuela's northern Monagas and Sucre states and Trinidad and Tobago. It inhabits tropical lowland and evergreen montane forests from sea level to 2,500 m (8,200 ft).

== Behavior ==
=== Feeding ===
The lined quail-dove forages singly or in pairs, feeding on seeds on the forest floor.

=== Breeding ===
The lined quail-dove's breeding season in Colombia spans at least from April to October and begins earlier in Trinidad and Tobago. One described nest was a deep cup of small twigs lined with dead leaves, placed in the fork of a tree 3.7 m (12 ft) above the ground. It contained two eggs.

=== Vocalization ===
The lined quail-dove's song is "a single monotonous low-pitched note 'whoOOo', with highest amplitude in the middle." Two birds will sing at the same time at slightly different pitches.

== Status ==
The IUCN has assessed the lined quail-dove as being of Least Concern. Its population has not been quantified; the species is believed to be fairly common but decreasing. Deforestation is a threat.
