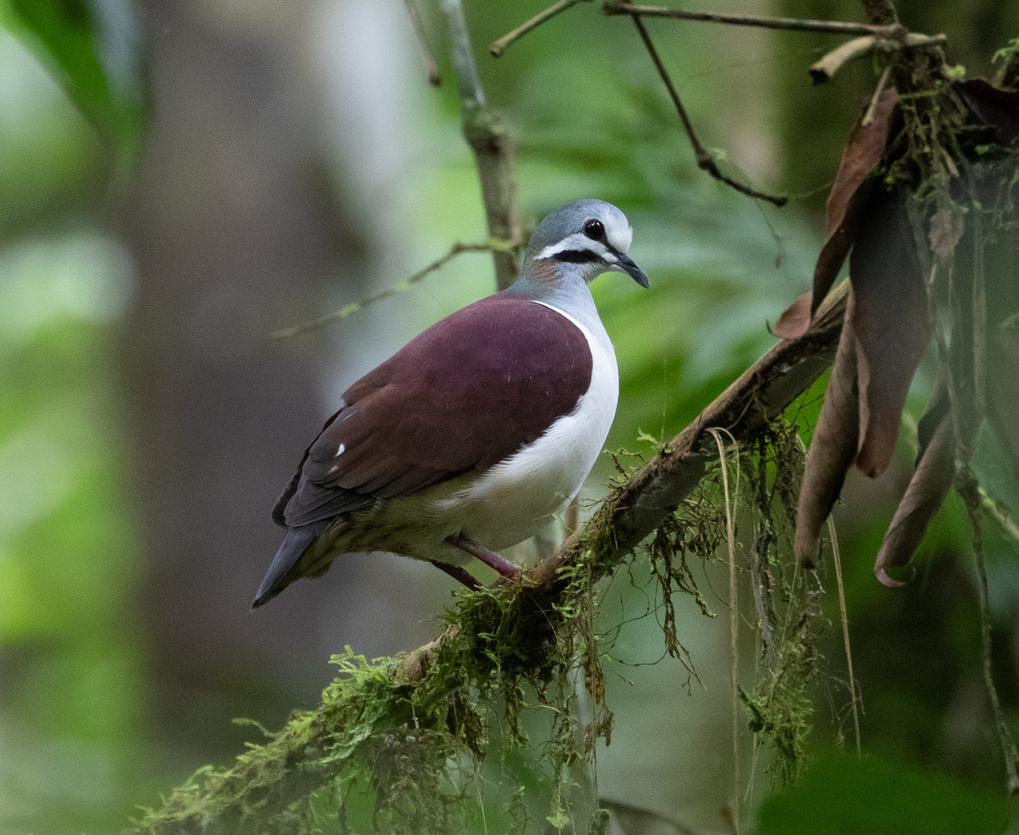

Conservation status
- Least Concern (IUCN 3.1)

Scientific classification
- Domain: Eukaryota
- Kingdom: Animalia
- Phylum: Chordata
- Class: Aves
- Order: Columbiformes
- Family: Columbidae
- Genus: Geotrygon
- Species: G. saphirina

Binomial name
- Geotrygon saphirina Bonaparte, 1855

Synonyms
- Osculatia saphirina

= Sapphire quail-dove =

Species of bird

The sapphire quail-dove (Geotrygon saphirina) is a species of bird in the family Columbidae. It is found in Brazil, Colombia, Ecuador, and Peru.

== Taxonomy and systematics ==
At one time the sapphire quail-dove included what is now the purple quail-dove as a subspecies; the larger species was then named Osculatia saphirina. Since the early 2010s the purple quail-dove has been treated as a separate species. The sapphire quail-dove now has two subspecies, the nominate G. s. saphirina and G. s. rothschildi.

== Description ==
The sapphire quail-dove is 22 to 26 cm (8.7 to 10.2 in) long and weighs 139 to 199 g (4.9 to 7.0 oz). The male of the nominate subspecies has a white forehead, throat, and small patch below the eye. It has a conspicuous, long, purple-black malar stripe. Its dark bluish gray crown becomes bronzy green on the nape; below that is an iridescent patch of green, gold, and purplish pink. The back and wing coverts are purple-brown and the rump iridescent greenish or purplish blue. The central tail feathers are slaty black and the outer ones are blackish with blue-gray tips. The closed wing shows an elongated white spot. The breast is pale gray fading to white on the belly and adjoined by buff flanks. Its eyes are pale yellow to dark brown. The adult female has the same plumage pattern but is less brilliant. Juveniles are dark reddish brown above, a duskier gray below, and their facial markings are less intense. G. s. rothschildi is essentially the same as the nominate but for darker eyes.

== Distribution and habitat ==
The nominate subspecies of sapphire quail-dove is found across far southern Colombia south through eastern Ecuador to southeastern Peru and east into extreme western Amazonian Brazil. G. s. rothschildi is found only in the area around Cadena in southeastern Peru's Marcapata District. The species inhabits the ground and undergrowth of primary and older secondary evergreen montane forest, often near streams. In Peru it ranges up 1,000 m (3,300 ft) in elevation and up to 1,350 m (4,430 ft) in Ecuador.

== Behavior ==
=== Feeding ===
The sapphire quail-dove forages on the ground, singly or in pairs. Its diet has not been documented but it probably eats seeds and small invertebrates like other quail-doves.

=== Breeding ===
The sapphire quail-dove's breeding season differs across its range, base on the dates that nests with eggs, nestlings, adults in breeding condition, and nesting behavior have been recorded. Nests are platforms made of sticks or twigs and the clutch size appears to be one or two.

=== Vocalization ===
The sapphire quail-dove's song is "a two-note monotonous 'hu..huuuuu' or 'ca..whooooo'." It sings from a low hidden perch or on the ground at any time of day.

== Status ==
The IUCN has assessed the sapphire quail-dove as being of Least Concern. "[The] limits of distribution of this distinctive species [are] poorly known...[the primary] threat to this species is accelerating deforestation in the Amazon basin".
