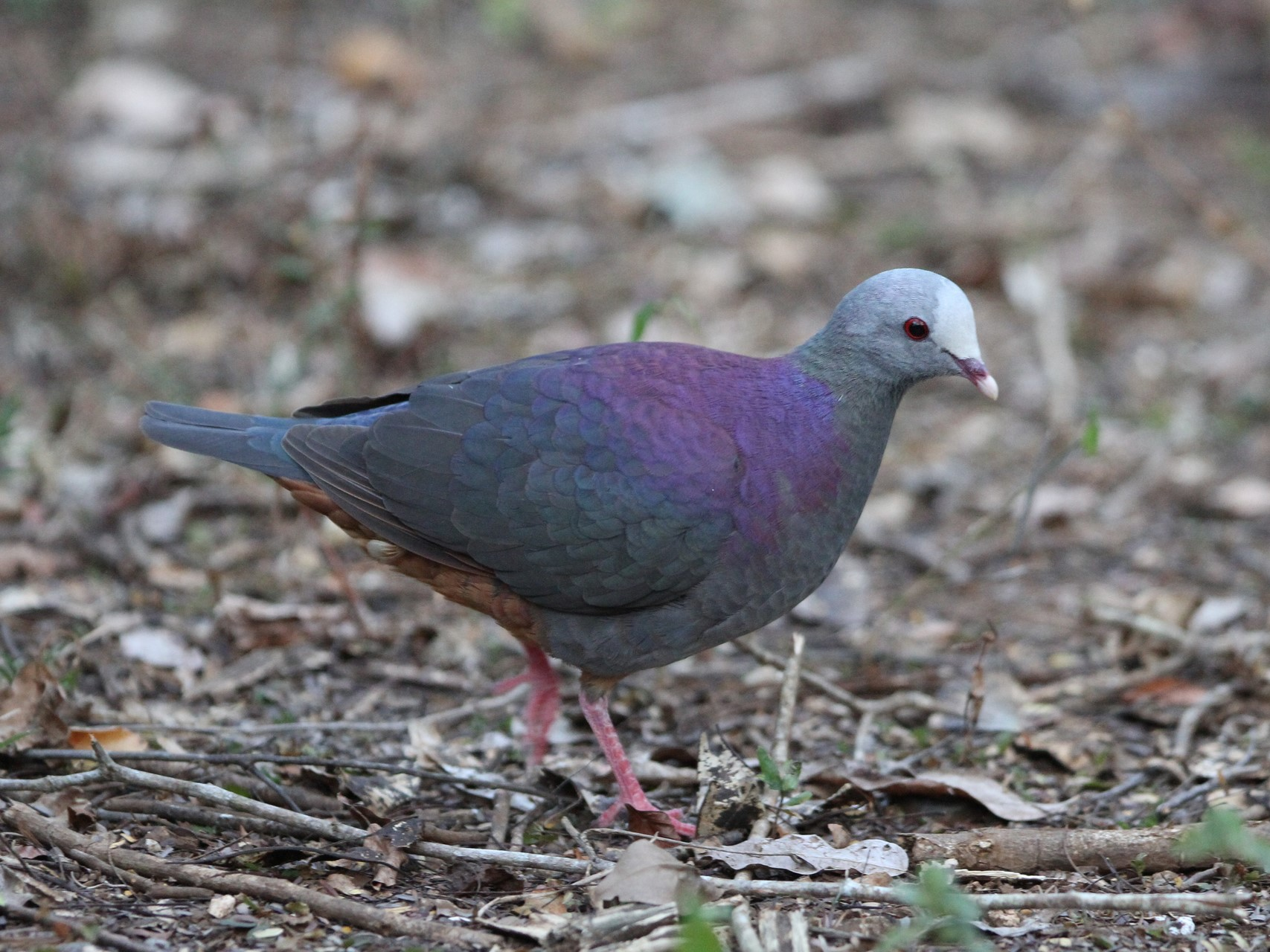

Conservation status
- Vulnerable (IUCN 3.1)

Scientific classification
- Kingdom: Animalia
- Phylum: Chordata
- Class: Aves
- Order: Columbiformes
- Family: Columbidae
- Genus: Geotrygon
- Species: G. caniceps

Binomial name
- Geotrygon caniceps (Gundlach, 1852)

Synonyms
- Columba caniceps Gundlach, 1852; Geotrygon caniceps caniceps Gundlach, JC, 1852; Oreopeleia caniceps caniceps Gundlach, JC, 1852

= Grey-fronted quail-dove =

Species of bird

The grey-fronted quail-dove (Geotrygon caniceps) is a species of bird in the family Columbidae. It is endemic to Cuba.

== Taxonomy and systematics ==
The grey-fronted quail-dove and most of what are now the other species in genus Geotrygon were previously in genus Oreopeleia. In addition, it was considered conspecific with what is now the white-fronted quail-dove (Geotrygon leucometopia) under the name "grey-headed quail-dove". Though the taxonomies of the North American Classification Committee of the American Ornithological Society (AOS), the International Ornithological Committee (IOC), and Clements use the English name "grey-fronted quail-dove" for the current G. caniceps, the Handbook of the Birds of the World retains the pre-split "grey-headed quail-dove" name for it.

The grey-fronted quail-dove is monotypic.

== Description ==
The male grey-fronted quail-dove is 26 to 30 cm (10 to 12 in) long and the female 27 cm (11 in). They weigh 192 to 210 g (6.8 to 7.4 oz). The adult male's forehead ("front") is grayish white darkening to gray on the rest of the head, with slight purplish iridescence on the back of it. The medium gray throat darkens on the breast, whose sides are gossy purple. The belly is cream and the vent area rufous. The shoulders are glossy purple, the lower back and rump bluish purple, and the tail gray. The adult female is very similar but duller. Juveniles have a brownish gray forehead, pale gray throat, dark brown upperparts, and chestnut underparts.

== Distribution and habitat ==
The grey-fronted quail-dove was formerly found throughout Cuba but is now apparently limited to the island's eastern margin and the Sierra del Rosario in the west. It favors wet primary and secondary forests in the lowlands and at elevations up to 1,200 m (3,900 ft).

== Behavior ==
=== Feeding ===
The grey-fronted quail-dove forages on the ground, singly or in pairs, where it feeds on seeds and small invertebrates.

=== Breeding ===
The grey-fronted quail-dove's breeding season spans at least from Jan to August. It builds a nest of twigs and leaves lined with rootlets and grass and places it 1 to 3 m (3.3 to 9.8 ft) above ground, typically in a bush surrounded by tall grass. The clutch size is one or two.

=== Vocalization ===
The grey-fronted quail-dove's song is a "long series of short, low-pitched 'haoo' or 'cooo' notes" that can be given slowly or very fast. It sings year round though less in the wet season.

== Status ==
The IUCN has assessed the grey-fronted quail-dove as Vulnerable because it has a small population that is declining due to hunting and habitat loss.
