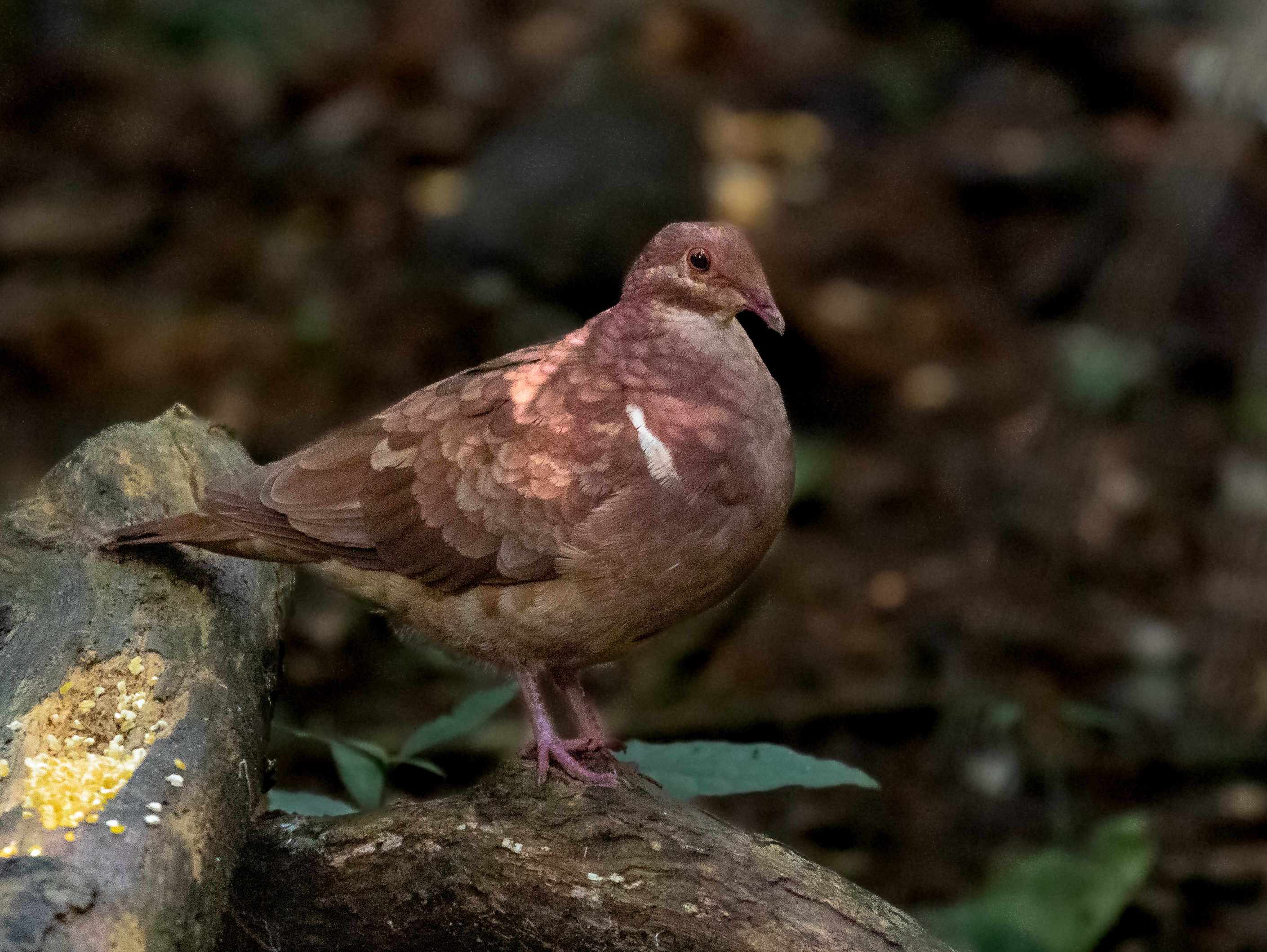

Conservation status
- Least Concern (IUCN 3.1)

Scientific classification
- Kingdom: Animalia
- Phylum: Chordata
- Class: Aves
- Order: Columbiformes
- Family: Columbidae
- Genus: Geotrygon
- Species: G. montana

Binomial name
- Geotrygon montana (Linnaeus, 1758)

Synonyms
- Columba montana Linnaeus, 1758

= Ruddy quail-dove =

Species of bird

The ruddy quail-dove (Geotrygon montana) is a species of bird in the dove and pigeon family Columbidae. It breeds throughout the West Indies, Central America, and tropical South America. It has appeared as a vagrant in Florida and southern Texas. It lays two buff-colored eggs on a flimsy platform built on a shrub. Some nests are built on the ground.

== Description ==
The ruddy quail-dove is approximately 19–28 cm in length. The bird is distinguished by having a rust-colored back, facial mask and similarly colored wings. The breast, rump and undereye stripe are lighter brown.

== Habitat ==
This bird is found in woodland and scrub forest. It also has adapted to coffee plantations. It is somewhat sensitive to forest fragmentation. These birds forage on the ground, mainly eating seeds. It will also take small invertebrates in its diet.

== Taxonomy ==
In the first half of the 18th century the ruddy quail-dove was described and illustrated by several naturalists including John Ray in 1713, Hans Sloane in 1725 and George Edwards in 1743. When in 1758 the Swedish naturalist Carl Linnaeus updated his Systema Naturae for the tenth edition, he placed the ruddy quail-dove with all the other pigeons in the genus Columba. Linnaeus included a brief description, coined the binomial name Columba montana and cited the earlier authors. The specific epithet is from the Latin montanus meaning "of the mountains". The species is now placed in the genus Geotrygon that was introduced in 1847 by the English naturalist Philip Henry Gosse.

Two subspecies are recognised:

- G. m. martinica (Linnaeus, 1766) – Lesser Antilles
- G. m. montana (Linnaeus, 1758) – Mexico to northeast Argentina, Greater Antilles, Trinidad

== See also ==
- List of Puerto Rican birds
- List of Vieques birds
