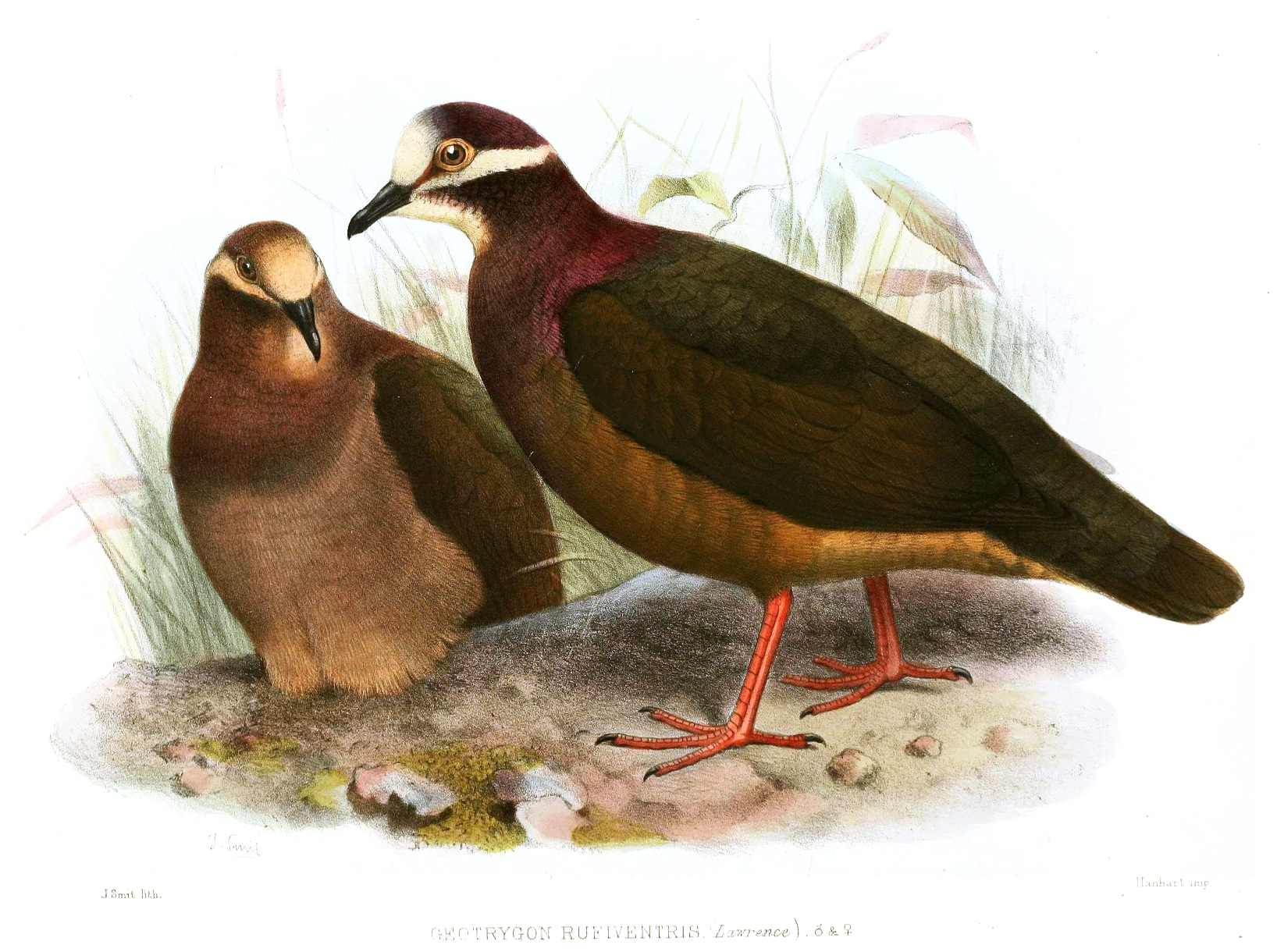
- Illustration by Joseph Smit, 1876

Conservation status
- Least Concern (IUCN 3.1)

Scientific classification
- Kingdom: Animalia
- Phylum: Chordata
- Class: Aves
- Order: Columbiformes
- Family: Columbidae
- Subfamily: Columbinae
- Tribe: Zenaidini
- Genus: Leptotrygon; Banks et al., 2013
- Species: L. veraguensis

Binomial name
- Leptotrygon veraguensis (Lawrence, 1866)

Synonyms
- Geotrygon veraguensis

= Olive-backed quail-dove =

Species of bird

The olive-backed quail-dove (Leptotrygon veraguensis) is a species of bird in the family Columbidae. It is found in Colombia, Costa Rica, Ecuador, Nicaragua, and Panama.

== Taxonomy and systematics ==
The olive-backed quail-dove was originally assigned to genus Geotrygon and even earlier to Oreopeleia, but a 2013 paper provided the basis for its present assignment. The American Ornithological Society (AOS) made the change in 2014 and the International Ornithological Committee (IOC) in 2015. It is the only species in its genus.

- Zenaidini
  - Geotrygon – 9 species
  - - - Leptotila – 11 species
      - Leptotrygon – olive-backed quail-dove
    - - Zenaida – 7 species
      - Zentrygon – 8 species

Cladogram showing the position of genera in the tribe Zenaidini.

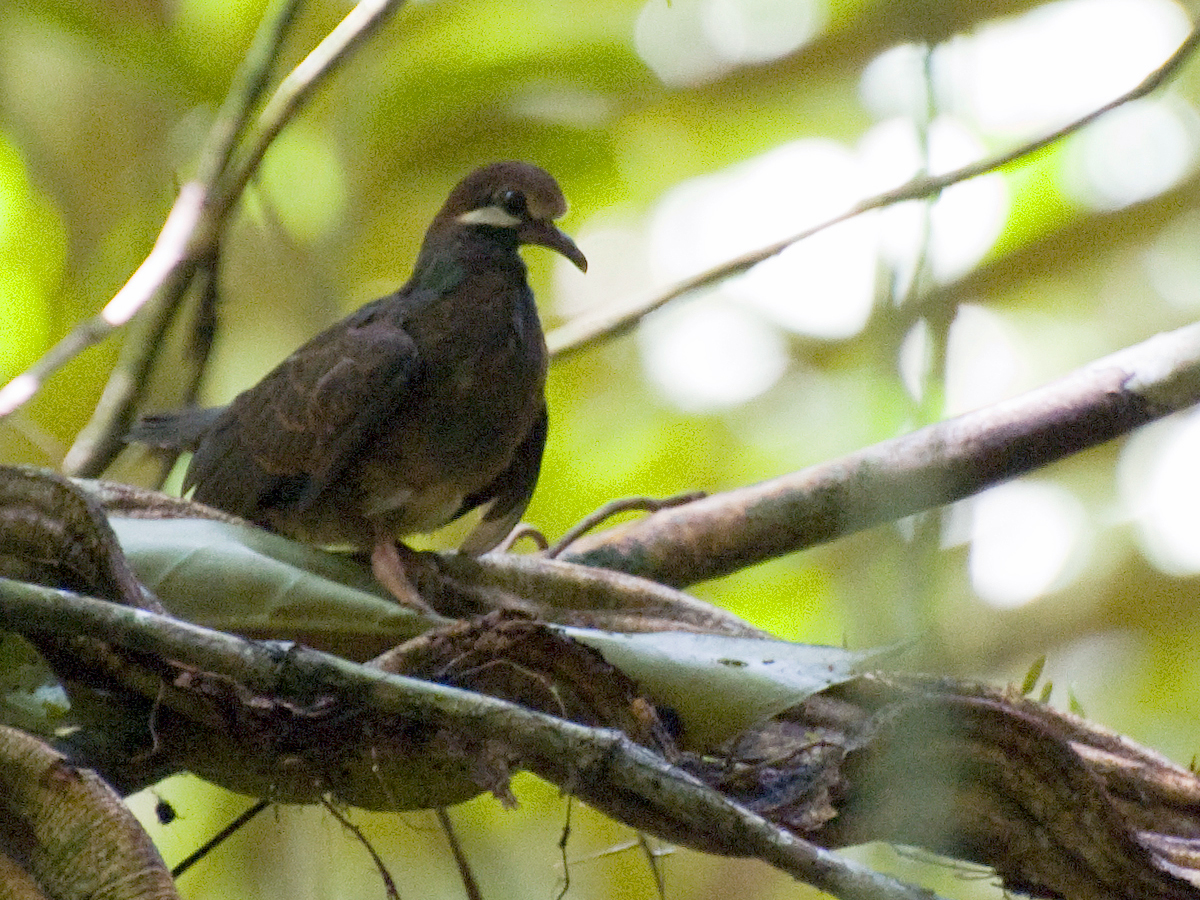
An olive-backed quail-dove in the wild

== Description ==
The male olive-backed quail-dove is 21 to 24.5 cm (8.3 to 9.6 in) long and the female 21 to 22 cm (8.3 to 8.7 in). They weigh about 155 g (5.5 oz). The adult's forehead is white transitioning to a gray crown and purple hindcrown, nape, and neck. A broad white stripe under the eye has a narrower black stripe under it. The upperparts are dark olive brown or purplish brown. The throat is white and the belly white or buffy white, with reddish buff flanks. The neck, breast, and upperparts have a greenish or purplish iridescence. The sexes are generally alike though the female may sometimes have a buff forehead and crown. Juveniles are similar as well but their feathers have rusty fringes and they have no iridescence.

== Distribution and habitat ==
The olive-backed quail dove is found on the Caribbean slope of far southern Nicaragua, Costa Rica, and Panama, and also the Pacific slope of eastern Panama through western Colombia into northern Ecuador's Esmeraldas Province. It inhabits dense wet forest, particularly wet ravines, from sea level to 900 m (3,000 ft).

== Behavior ==
=== Movement ===
The olive-backed quail-dove is a year round resident in its range. It prefers to walk or run when fleeing from danger, but sometimes flushes for short distances if disturbed.

=== Feeding ===
The olive-backed quail-dove forages singly or in pairs, searching the understory or on the ground for seeds, fruits, and small invertebrates.

=== Breeding ===
The olive-backed quail-dove's breeding season spans January to July in Costa Rica, and breeding evidence has been recorded between those months elsewhere in its range. It makes a bulky nest of twigs and rootlets in vegetation, usually about 1 to 2 m (3.3 to 6.6 ft) of the ground. The clutch size is two.

=== Vocalization ===
The olive-backed quail-dove's song is "a low-pitched short single note 'whOuw', with a rather frog-like quality."

== Status ==
The IUCN has assessed the olive-backed quail-dove as being of Least Concern. It is common in parts of its range, but "[d]eforestation undoubtedly poses a threat to this species."
