= San Martin Tuxtla =

Shield volcano in Veracruz, Mexico

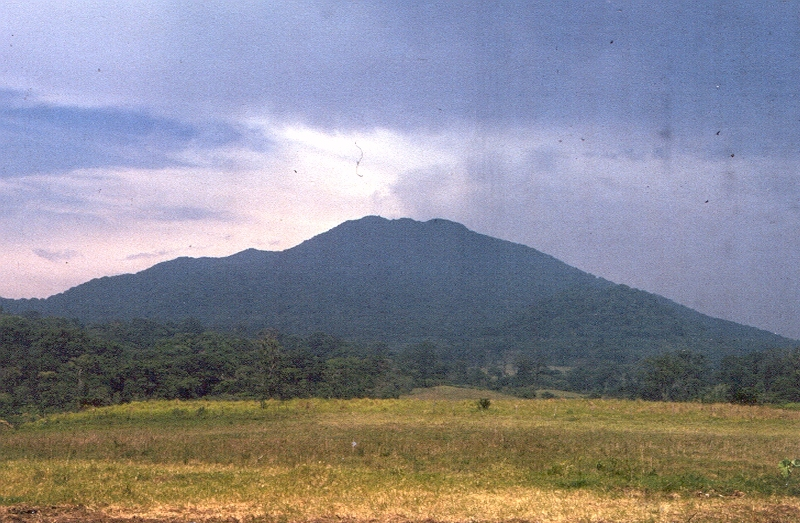

Highest point
- Elevation: 1,650 m (5,410 ft)
- Coordinates: 18°34′0″N 95°12′0″W

Geography
- Location within Mexico
- Location: Gulf of Mexico, Mexico

Geology
- Mountain type: Shield Volcano
- Last eruption: 1794 to 1796

The isolated San Martin Tuxtla volcano is a shield volcano which rises above the Gulf of Mexico. It has had eruptions in historical times. It occurs in the Tuxtla volcanic field in Veracruz, Mexico. Lavas from San Martin vary between basanite and alkali basalt. Locally the volcano is also known as Tiltépetl (Black Mountain in the Nahuatl language).

== Morphology ==
San Martin forms a broad shield volcano, it rises to a height of 1680 m and is capped by a 1 km wide summit crater which is 150 m in depth. The crater contains two pyroclastic cones that were the source of the large 1793 eruption. The flanks of the volcano are dotted with 250 pyroclastic cones and maars, some of which have been active in historical times. The volcano is currently densely forested.

== Eruptions ==
1664 eruption: A large VEI 3 eruption occurred from the southeast flank. This led to an evacuation.

1793 eruption: A large VEI 4 eruption came from two pyroclastic cones in the summit, it produced widespread ashfall and lava flows that ran down the northeast flank.

1794-1796 eruption: A small VEI 2 eruption that continued for two years started in May, 1794.
