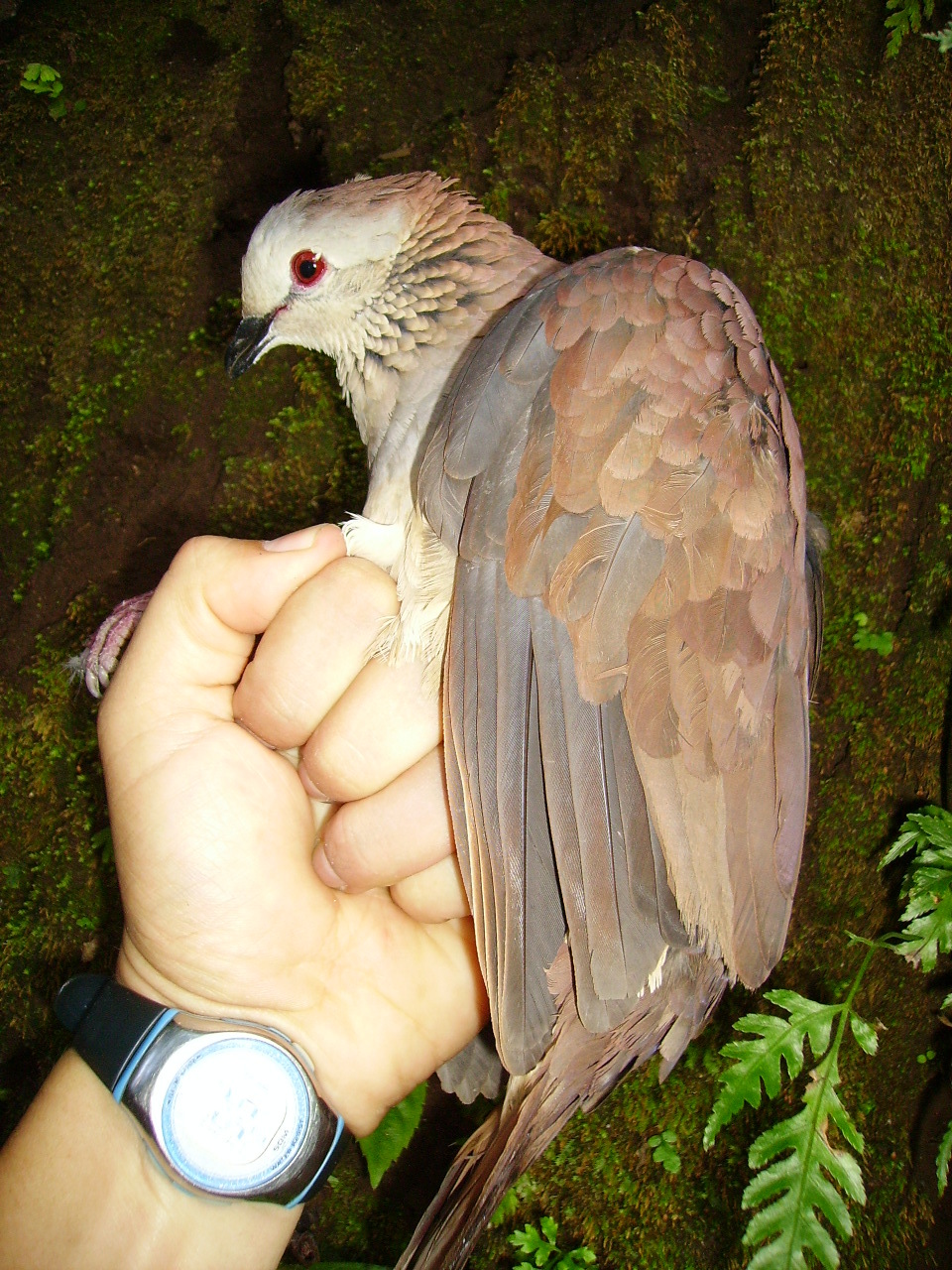

Conservation status
- Least Concern (IUCN 3.1)

Scientific classification
- Domain: Eukaryota
- Kingdom: Animalia
- Phylum: Chordata
- Class: Aves
- Order: Columbiformes
- Family: Columbidae
- Genus: Zentrygon
- Species: Z. albifacies

Binomial name
- Zentrygon albifacies (Sclater, PL, 1858)

Synonyms
- Geotrygon albifacies; Oreopeleia albifacies

= White-faced quail-dove =

Species of bird

The white-faced quail-dove (Zentrygon albifacies) is a species of bird in the family Columbidae. It is found in El Salvador, Guatemala, Honduras, Mexico, and Nicaragua.

== Taxonomy and systematics ==
The white-faced quail-dove is monotypic. It was originally described in genus Geotrygon, later placed in genus Oreopeleia, and still later in its present Zentrygon. Its relationships with the other members of its genus have not been fully resolved.

== Description ==
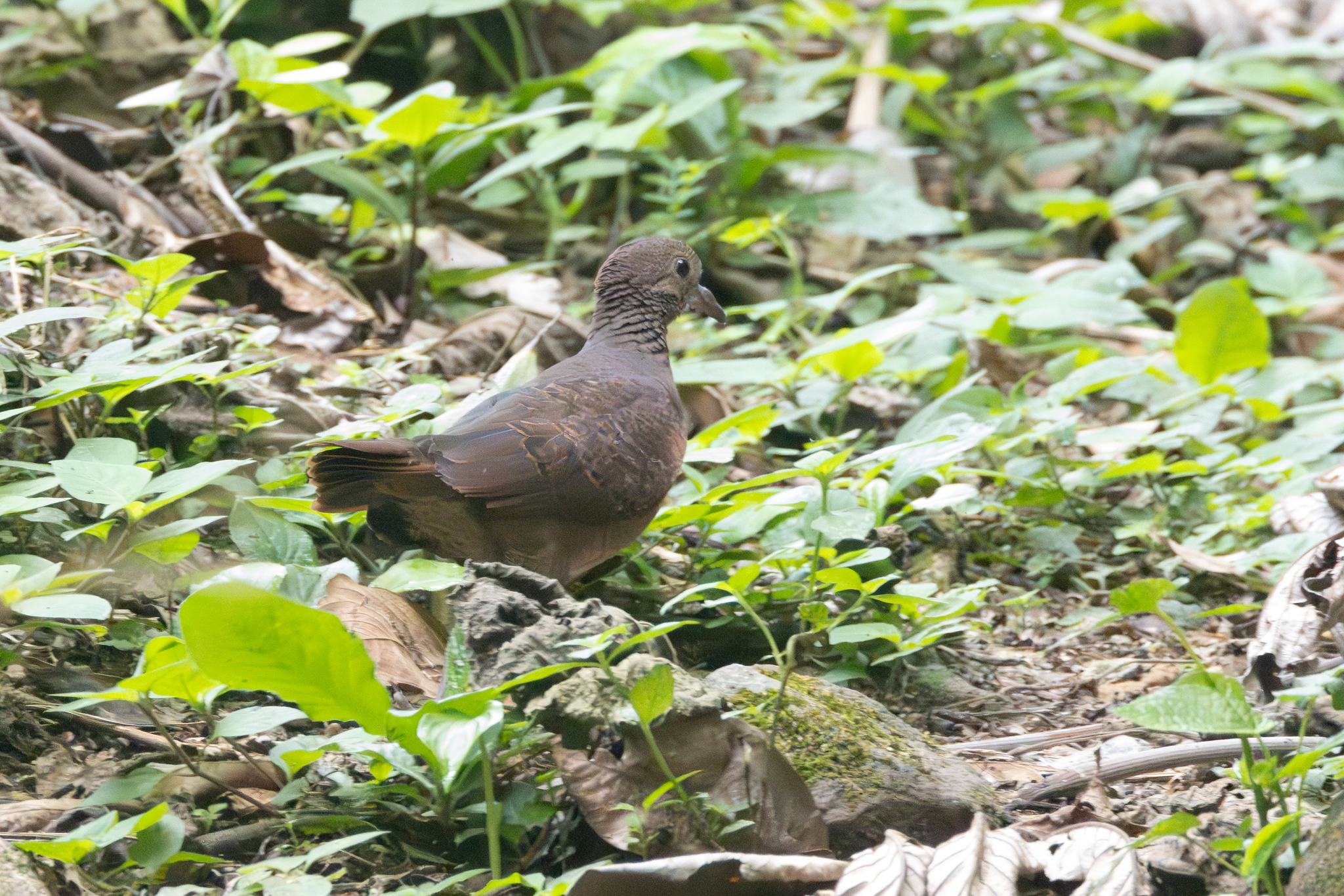
Juvenile

The white-faced quail-dove is 28 to 31.5 cm (11.0 to 12.4 in) long. Eleven specimens had weights ranging from 158 to 339 g (5.6 to 12.0 oz). Adults' crowns are gray, from very light in front fairly deep at the back and into the nape. The hindneck and sides of the neck are cinnamon; on the latter loose feathers give the impression of dark furrows. The rest of the upperparts are chestnut and the back has a bluish violet gloss. The wings are dark dusky grayish brown. The face is pale grayish buff and the chin and throat pale buff. The breast is buffy gray that pales and adds a cinnamon tone at the belly. The eye is orange to red surrounded by bare blue-gray skin. The legs and feet are red. Juveniles' crowns are pale brown, their upperparts brown with dusky bars, and the breast and sides tawny brown with dusky bars.

== Distribution and habitat ==
The white-faced quail-dove is found discontinuously in several southern states of Mexico, much of Guatemala and Honduras, and small areas of northern El Salvador and northwestern Nicaragua. It inhabits humid montane forest of several types including evergreen and pine-evergreen, and also shade coffee plantations. In elevation it ranges between 1,000 and 2,700 m (3,300 and 8,900 ft).

== Behavior ==
=== Feeding ===
The white-faced quail-dove forages singly or in pairs while walking on the ground, where it tends to favor dense cover. Its diet has not been documented but is assumed to be seeds, fallen fruits, and maybe insects.

=== Roosting ===
The white-faced quail-dove roosts above the ground. It typically walks along branches or hops up to the roost rather than flying. Up to eight birds have been observed roosting together.

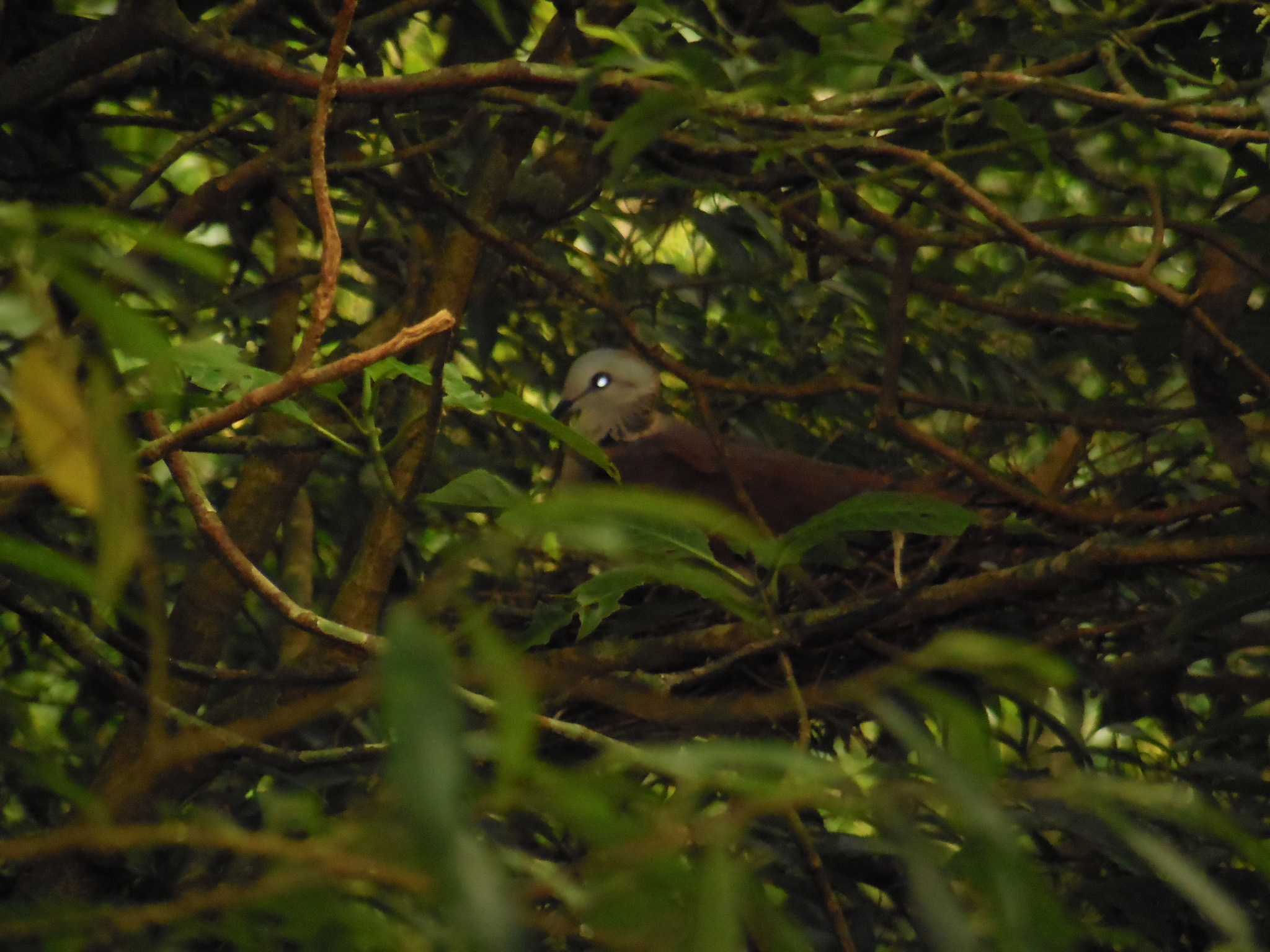
At nest

=== Breeding ===
The whte-faced quail-dove's breeding season appears to vary within its range but has not been studied. Nests are loosely constructed of sticks and placed where they are well concealed, as high as 6 m (20 ft) above ground. The clutch size is two.

=== Vocalization ===
The white-faced quail-dove's song is "a low, hollow, mournful whoooo or whoo'oo."

== Status ==
The IUCN has assessed the white-faced quail-dove as being of Least Concern. However, though it has a large range, its population is believed to be declining, and it is considered by Mexican authorities to be threatened there.
