= List of onomatopoeias =

This is a list of onomatopoeias, i.e. words that imitate, resemble, or suggest the source of the sound that they describe. For more information, see the linked articles.

== Human vocal sounds ==
- Achoo, Atishoo, the sound of a sneeze
- Ahem, a sound made to clear the throat or to draw attention before speaking
- Burp, the sound of gas being expelled through the mouth
- Chomp, the sound of someone biting down on food
- Cough, the sound made when clearing the throat or lungs
- Hiccup, a repeated, involuntary sound caused by a spasm of the diaphragm
- Hum, a low, continuous sound
- Sigh, a deep exhalation suggesting exasperation
- Slurp, the sound of someone drinking or eating
- Yawn, the sound someone makes when they're tired or bored
- Ow, Ouch, a short sound made when someone is in pain
- Mwah, the sound made when kissing

== Sounds made by devices or other objects ==
- Awooga, or Aooga, the sound of an old-fashioned vehicle horn
- Beep, a high-pitched signal
- Beep, beep, 1929 word for a car horn
- Bonk, common sound of two objects striking each other
- Ching, the sound of metal on metal
- Clink, the sound of glass on glass
- Fizz, sound of effervescence
- Flutter, sound of rapid motion, e.g. aeroelastic flutter
- Oom-pah, the rhythmical sound of a deep brass instrument in a band
- Ring, the sound made by an old telephone
- Slosh, the sound of liquid moving inside a container
- Splash, sound of water upon disturbance
- Tick tick tick, sound of a timer
- Tick tock, sound of a clock
- Twang, having the sharp, vibrating tone of a plucked string
- Vroom, sound of an engine revving up
- Zap, sound of an electrostatic discharge

== Things named after sounds ==
- Choo Choo, childish word for a train, after the sound of a steam locomotive
- Flip-flops, a type of sandal
- Khilkhilat, a type of ambulance in Gujarat for transporting newborn babies, meaning "Giggles"
- Tuk-tuk, word for an auto rickshaw in parts of Asia, Africa, and Latin America
- Tweeter, a high frequency loudspeaker named after a bird's shrill tweet
- Woofer, a low frequency loudspeaker named after a dog's low bark

== Animal and bird names ==
- Aye-aye
- Bobolink
- Bobwhite
- Chachalaca
- Chickadee
- Chiffchaff
- Chuck-will's-widow
- Cricket
- Coquí
- Cuckoo
- Currawong
- Curlew
- Dickcissel
- Dik-dik
- Hadada
- Hoopoe
- Hoot owl
- Kea
- Killdeer
- Kiskadee
- Mopoke, morepork or boobook owl
- Pewee
- Pobblebonk
- Potoo
- Poorwill
- Spring Peeper
- Weero
- Whip-poor-will (Eastern)
- Whip-poor-will (Mexican)
- Willet

== Animal and bird noises ==
For sounds listed by the name of the animal, see List of animal sounds.

English words for animal noises include:

- Baa, vocalization of sheep, Baa, Baa, Black Sheep
- Bark, sound of a dog
- Bleat, sound of a sheep
- Buzz, sound of bees or insects flying
- Chirp, bird call
- Chirp, sound made by rubbing together feet or other body parts, e.g. by a cricket or a cicada
- Gobble, a turkey call
- Growl, low, guttural vocalization produced by predatory animals
- Hiss, sound made by a snake
- Honk, call of the male Canada goose
- Hoot, call of an owl
- Howl, sound made by canines, especially wolves
- Meow, cry of a cat
- Moo, sound of a cow
- Purr, a tonal, fluttering sound made by all members of the cat family
- Quack, call of a duck
- Ribbit, sound of some Pacific tree frogs or bullfrogs
- Roar, deep, bellowing outburst made by various animals
- Screech, high-pitched strident or piercing sound, as made by a screech owl
- Tweet, sound of a bird
- Woof, sound of a dog
- Yowl, sound of an animal

== Music groups or terms ==
- Bebop, a style of jazz
- Boom bap, a subgenre and production style of hip hop named after the sounds used for the bass and snare drums
- Boom Boom Pow, song recorded by American group the Black Eyed Peas for their fifth studio album The E.N.D. (2009).
- Cha-cha-chá, a genre of Cuban music named for the sound of dancers' feet as they graze the floor
- Djent, a style of progressive metal named after the sound of a palm-muted guitar
- Donk, a style of UK house music containing distinctive percussion sounds
- Doof doof, Australian slang term describes electronic music heard at raves
- Kecak, part of a musical drama, is named after monkey chatter, and "chak" is also the sound of a struck bar percussion instrument as in a gamelan
- Oom-pah, brass instruments, also Humppa
- Ratatat, a New York City experimental electronic rock duo
- Ska, a style of music characterised by a walking bass line
- Vroom Vroom (EP), third extended play by British singer Charli XCX and featuring production work from British producer Sophie.
- Wah-wah, the sound of altering the resonance of musical notes to extend expressiveness

== Works, groups and characters named after sounds ==
- "Boum!", a song.
- Chitty Chitty Bang Bang, a fictional car in the film of the same name based on the children's novel by Ian Fleming, named for the unusual noise of its engine.
- Clank, from the video game series Ratchet & Clank.
- Cock a doodle doo, from a nursery rhyme about a cockerel.
- Kachi-kachi Yama, a Japanese folktale, named for the crackling of a fire.
- Rattle and Hum, sixth album by the Irish band U2.
- Snap, Crackle and Pop, advertising mascots for branded cereal.
- Tung Tung Tung Sahur, an Italian brainrot character which is an anthropomorphic wooden object resembling a mudgar who holds a baseball bat, named after a Sundanese onomatopoeia of how Indonesians traditionally beat drums to commence suhur.
- Whaam!, pop art painting drawing from onomatopoeia in superhero comics (in this case, an explosion).
- Wham!, a 1980s English musical duo formed by members George Michael and Andrew Ridgeley.

== Sounds in fiction ==
- Bamf, the sound Nightcrawler makes when teleporting
- Biff, Pow, Wham, Bam, Zap etc, used to represent punching an enemy in silver age superhero comic books, popularized by the 1966 Batman TV Series
- Budda Budda Budda, commonly used in Marvel and DC comics to represent machine gun fire
- Krakoom and Thoom, respectively the sound of thunder summoned by Thor's hammer Mjolnir and when the hammer physically hits a target
- Pew-pew or pew-pew-pew, the sound of a laser gun in science fiction
- Shrrm, the sound of a lightsaber being ignited
- Snikt, the sound of Wolverine's claws being extended
- Thwip, the sound that Spider-Man's web shooters make
- Vwoop, the sound of an Enderman from Minecraft teleporting
- Vworp, the sound the TARDIS makes when it materializes

== See also ==
- "The Bells", a heavily onomatopoeic poem
- Bling-bling, an ideophone for ostentatious accessories
- Cross-linguistic onomatopoeias
- Old MacDonald Had a Farm, an American folk song about animal sounds
