= OVV =

OVV can refer to:

- OVV quasar
- Orient Air (ICAO airline code OVV), Syrian airline; see List of airline codes (O)
- Ovintiv (stock ticker: OVV), hydrocarbon exploration company
- Dutch Safety Board (Dutch: Onderzoeksraad Voor Veiligheid, OVV)
- Alliance of Flemish Organizations (Dutch: Overlegcentrum van Vlaamse Verenigingen, OVV)
- OVV (football club) (Dutch: Oostvoornse Voetbalvereniging, OVV), a soccer club
- Austrian Volleyball Federation (German: Österreichischer Volleyballverband, ÖVV)
- Venezuelan Violence Observatory (Spanish: Observatorio Venezolano de Violencia, OVV), see Crime in Venezuela
- Order of Vittorio Veneto (O.V.V.), see List of post-nominal letters (Italy)

== See also ==
- O2V (disambiguation)
- OV2 (disambiguation)
- OW (disambiguation)
- OOV (disambiguation)
- OV (disambiguation)
