= OOV =

OOV may refer to:

- Oov, a dialect of the Mutu language
- Our Own Voice Literary Journal: Beyond Homeland (OOV), a Philippine literary journal
- out of vision (OOV), see Glossary of broadcasting terms
- Out of vocabulary (OOV), words not found in the internal dictionaries
  - in statistical machine translation
  - in audio mining
- Officer of the Order of Volta (O.O.V.), see List of abbreviations in Ghana

== See also ==
- 112 (emergency telephone number), for the Openbare Orde en Veiligheid (OOV) in the Netherlands
- O2V (disambiguation)
- OVV (disambiguation)
- OV (disambiguation)
