= O2V =

O2V may refer to:

- Vanadium(IV) oxide (O_{2}V; VO_{2}; O_{2}V_{(IV)}; V_{(IV)}O_{2}), a chemical compound composed of vanadium and oxygen
- O-type main-sequence star (OV star) of the O2V subtype

== See also ==
- OW (disambiguation)
- OVV (disambiguation)
- OV2 (disambiguation)
- OOV (disambiguation)
- OV (disambiguation)
