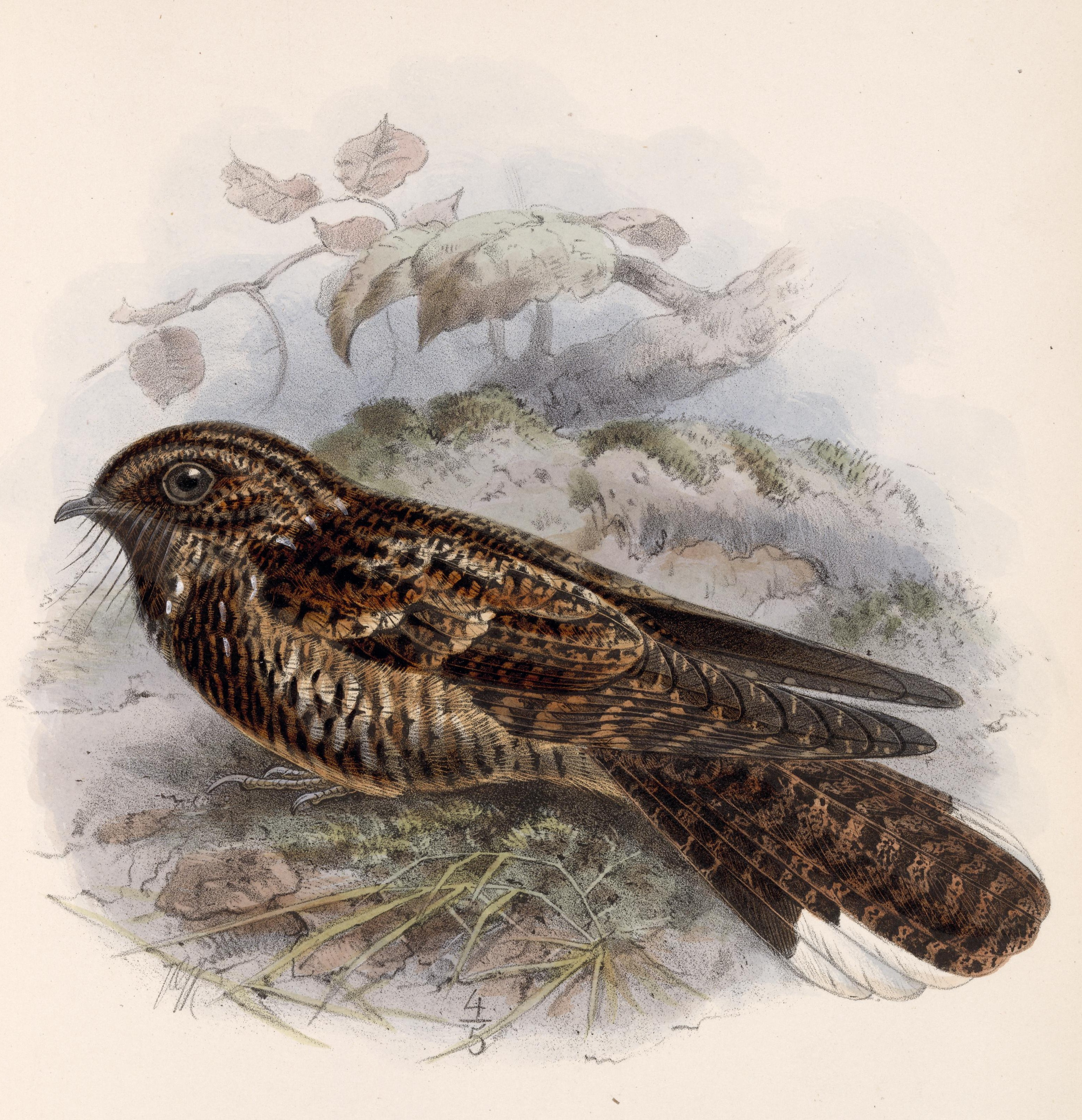

Conservation status
- Least Concern (IUCN 3.1)

Scientific classification
- Kingdom: Animalia
- Phylum: Chordata
- Class: Aves
- Clade: Strisores
- Order: Caprimulgiformes
- Family: Caprimulgidae
- Genus: Antrostomus
- Species: A. saturatus

Binomial name
- Antrostomus saturatus Salvin, 1870

Synonyms
- Caprimulgus saturatus

= Dusky nightjar =

Species of bird

The dusky nightjar or dusky whip-poor-will (Antrostomus saturatus) is a species of nightjar in the family Caprimulgidae. It is found in Costa Rica and Panama.

== Taxonomy and systematics ==
The dusky nightjar was originally described as Antrostomus saturatus; that genus was later merged into Caprimulgus and later still restored to generic status. It appears to be most closely related to the eastern and Mexican whip-poor-wills (A. vociferus and A. arizonae, respectively). The dusky nightjar is monotypic.

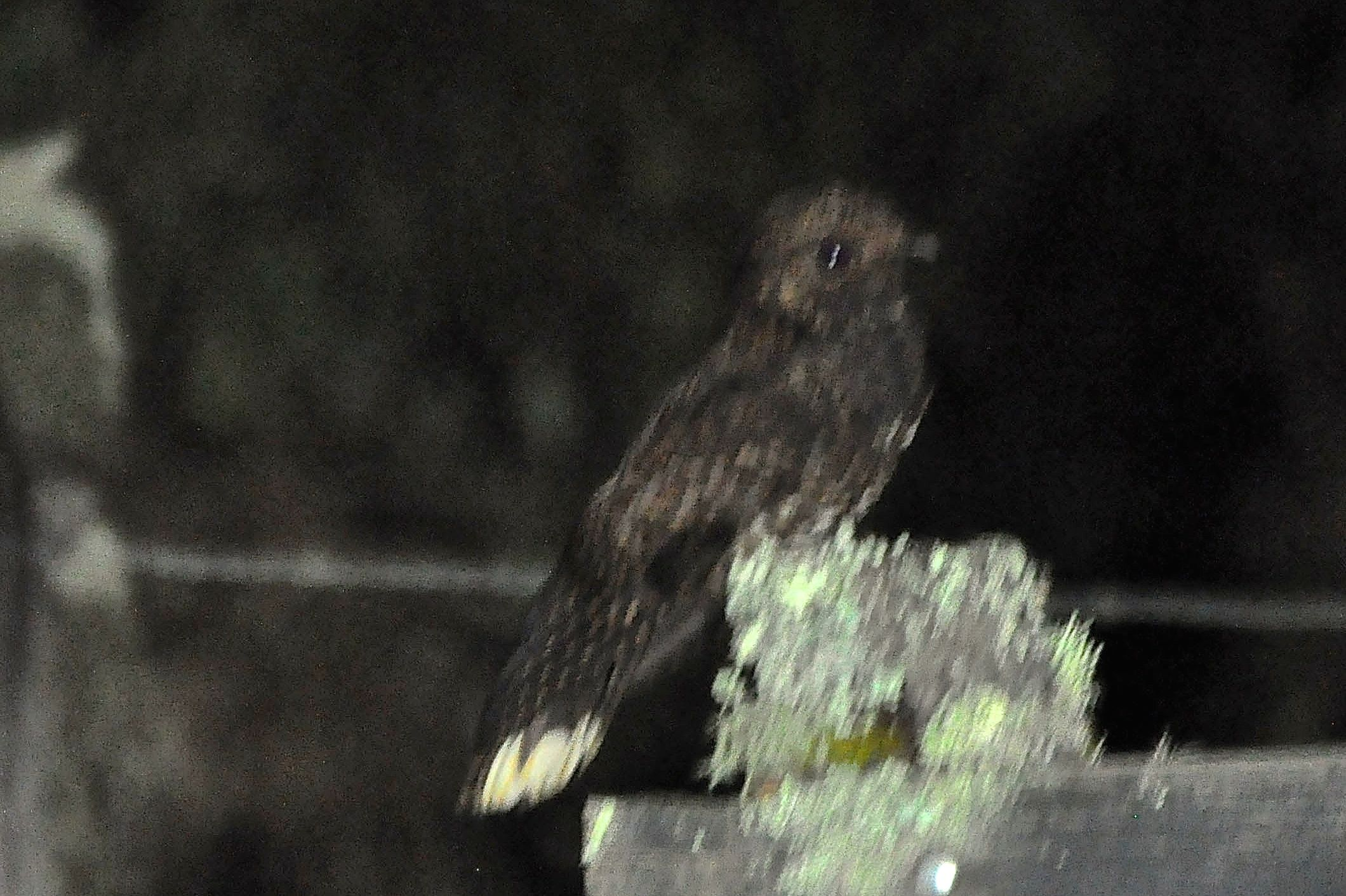

== Description ==
The dusky nightjar is 21 to 25 cm (8.3 to 9.8 in) long. A male weighed 52.9 g (1.9 oz) and a female 51 g (1.8 oz). The adult male's upperparts are sooty black with fine reddish cinnamon spots and bars. Much of the face is also reddish cinnamon. The central tail feathers are sooty black with reddish cinnamon bars; the outer three pairs have wide white tips and less barring. The wings are blackish with reddish cinnamon bars. The throat and breast are sooty black with scattered white spots and have a narrow band of white and buff separating them. The belly is cinnamon to buff with narrow black bars. The adult female is similar to the male, but the reddish buff markings are larger giving a more reddish overall appearance. The tips of the outer tail feathers are narrow and buff rather than wide and white. Juveniles are somewhat paler and more reddish than the adults.

== Distribution and habitat ==
The dusky nightjar has a wide but scattered distribution through the highlands of Costa Rica. In Panama it occurs only on Volcán Barú in Chiriquí Province. In elevation it ranges from 1,500 to 3,100 m (4,900 to 10,200 ft). It inhabits the edges and openings of humid montane forest rather than its interior.

== Behavior ==
=== Feeding ===
The dusky nightjar is nocturnal. It forages mostly with sallies from a perch several meters above the ground and rarely from the ground itself. Its prey is flying insects; beetles and moths appear to be the most prevalent items.

=== Breeding ===
The dusky nightjar's breeding season appears to span from February or March into April. Only one nest has been described; it was "a small grass-lined depression" among grass and ferns and contained one egg.

=== Vocalization ===
The male dusky nightjar's song is "a trilled, double-noted whistle prurrr prureee or prurrrr prruwhip". It is sung mostly during the breeding season, from a perch and rarely from the ground, and may be sung throughout moonlit nights. A flight call is described as "a scratchy wheer."

== Status ==
The IUCN has assessed the dusky nightjar as being of Least Concern. Though it has a small range, its estimated population of at least 20,000 mature individuals is believed to be stable. No immediate threats have been identified.
