= OV2 =

OV2 or variation, may refer to:

- Orbiting Vehicle 2 (OV2) series of satellites
  - OV2-1
  - OV2-2
  - OV2-3
  - OV2-4
  - OV2-5
- Operational View 2 (OV-2), Operational Node Connectivity
- British NVC community OV2, in the UK National Vegetation Classification System
- .OV2 file format; see List of filename extensions (M–R)

== See also ==
- O2V (disambiguation)
- OVV (disambiguation)
- OW (disambiguation)
- OV (disambiguation)
