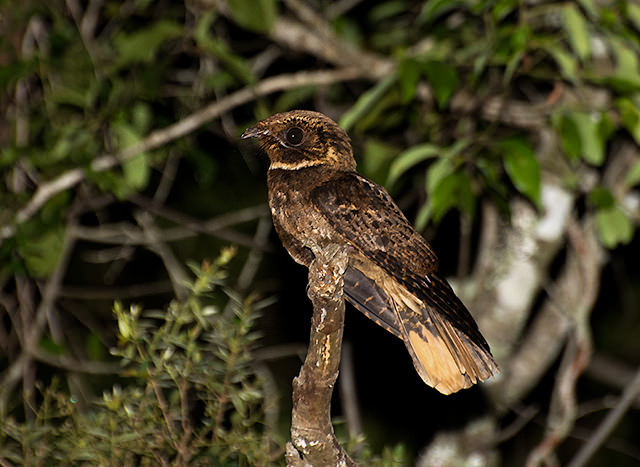

Conservation status
- Least Concern (IUCN 3.1)

Scientific classification
- Kingdom: Animalia
- Phylum: Chordata
- Class: Aves
- Order: Caprimulgiformes
- Family: Caprimulgidae
- Genus: Antrostomus
- Species: A. rufus

Binomial name
- Antrostomus rufus (Boddaert, 1783)

Synonyms
- Caprimulgus rufus

= Rufous nightjar =

Species of bird

The rufous nightjar (Antrostomus rufus) is a species of nightjar in the family Caprimulgidae. It is found in Argentina, Bolivia, Brazil, Colombia, Costa Rica, Ecuador, Guyana, Panama, Paraguay, Peru, Saint Lucia, Suriname, Trinidad and Tobago, and Venezuela.

== Taxonomy and systematics ==
The rufous nightjar was described by the French polymath Georges-Louis Leclerc, Comte de Buffon in 1780 in his Histoire Naturelle des Oiseaux. The bird was also illustrated in a hand-colored plate engraved by François-Nicolas Martinet in the Planches Enluminées D'Histoire Naturelle that was produced under the supervision of Edme-Louis Daubenton to accompany Buffon's text. Neither the plate caption nor Buffon's description included a scientific name but in 1783 the Dutch naturalist Pieter Boddaert coined the binomial name Caprimulgas rufus in his catalogue of the Planches Enluminées. The rufous nightjar is now placed in the genus Antrostomus that was erected by the French naturalist Charles Bonaparte in 1838. The generic name combines the Ancient Greek antron meaning "cavern" and stoma meaning "mouth". The specific epithet is Latin for "red".

Four or five subspecies are generally recognized. A. r. saltarius is recognized by the Clements taxonomy and BirdLife International's Handbook of the Birds of the World (HBW). The International Ornithological Committee (IOC) does not but includes it within A. r. rutilus. A sixth subspecies, A. r. maximus, is recognized by some authors but not by the Clements, HBW, or the IOC; they include it within A. r. minimus. It is known only from the holotype

The subspecies are:

- A. r. minimus (Griscom & Greenway, 1937)
- A. r. rufus (Boddaert, 1783)
- A. r. otiosus Bangs, 1911
- A. r. rutilus Burmeister, 1856
- A. r. saltarius Olrog, 1979

== Description ==
The rufous nightjar is 25 to 30 cm (9.8 to 12 in) long. Males weight 88 to 98 g (3.1 to 3.5 oz) and females 89 to 98 g (3.1 to 3.5 oz). It is almost entirely reddish brown, with a buff collar on the sides and back of the neck and a white band under the throat. The upperparts have dark brown streaks, the wings are spotted and barred with dark brown, and the underparts are speckled with dark brown and white. The wings have no white, unlike those of many others of its family. The outer three pairs of tail feathers of the male have a large white spot at the end; those of the female have a pale buff tip. The subspecies differ somewhat in the intensity of the various colors and the size and extent of spots and speckles. A. r. saltarius, however, is significantly grayer than the others.

== Distribution and habitat ==
The rufous nightjar has a highly discontinuous distribution. The subspecies are found thus:

- A. r. minimus, southern Costa Rica, Panama, and east along the Caribbean coasts of Colombia and Venezuela to Trinidad
- A. r. rufus, discontinuously in eastern Venezuela, Guyana and Suriname, and central Brazil
- A. r. otiosus, St. Lucia (Lesser Antilles)
- A. r. rutilus, southeastern Bolivia and central Brazil south to Paraguay and northeastern Argentina
- A. r. saltarius, southern Bolivia and northwestern Argentina

The South American Classification Committee of the American Ornithological Society (AOS) also places the species in Ecuador and Peru but does not note which subspecies are there.

The St. Lucia endemic subspecies of rufous nightjar (A. r. otiosus) inhabits dry scrub. The other subspecies inhabit a wide variety of landscapes from scrublands to primary and secondary forest. The landscapes vary in humidity from the dry Gran Chaco to the humid Amazon basin.

== Behavior ==
The rufous nightjar is most active at dawn and dusk. It roosts during the day, either on a low perch or on the ground under thick vegetation.

=== Feeding ===
The rufous nightjar forages by sallies from a low perch such as a branch or fencepost. Its diet is insects though details are lacking.

=== Breeding ===
The rufous nightjar lays its clutch of one or two eggs on bare ground without a conventional nest. It is usually hidden in low vegetation. The female incubates during the day.

=== Vocalization ===
The rufous nightjar's song has been interpreted by several authors; two examples are "a loud, staccato chup, whi-whi-RIoh or chuck whip-his-WIDdow, repeated fairly rapidly" and "an energetic, rhythmic chuck, wick-wick-WEEoo." The song is usually given from a perch at any level up to 20 m (66 ft) above the ground.

== Status ==
The IUCN has assessed the rufous nightjar as being of Least Concern. It has a vary large range and population, though the latter is believed to be decreasing. No immeditate threats have been identified.
