= OWW =

OWW may refer to:

- Oxford, Worcester and Wolverhampton Railway, a railway company operating between 1852 and 1860
- Old Westminsters, people who were educated at Westminster School

== See also ==
- Ow (disambiguation)
