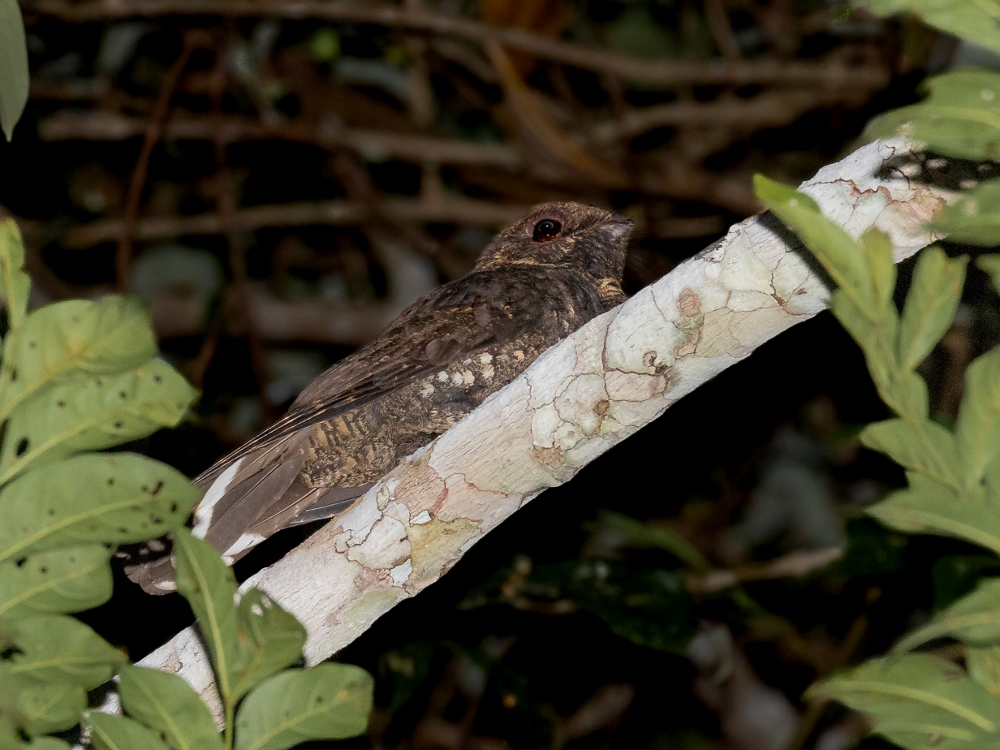

Conservation status
- Least Concern (IUCN 3.1)

Scientific classification
- Kingdom: Animalia
- Phylum: Chordata
- Class: Aves
- Clade: Strisores
- Order: Caprimulgiformes
- Family: Caprimulgidae
- Genus: Antrostomus
- Species: A. sericocaudatus

Binomial name
- Antrostomus sericocaudatus Cassin, 1849

Synonyms
- Caprimulgus sericocaudatus

= Silky-tailed nightjar =

Species of bird

The silky-tailed nightjar (Antrostomus sericocaudatus) is a species of nightjar birds in the family Caprimulgidae. It is found in Brazil, Argentina, Bolivia, Paraguay, and Peru. Its natural habitat is subtropical or tropical moist lowland forests.

== Taxonomy and systematics ==
The silky-tailed nightjar has two subspecies, the nominate Antrostomus sericocaudatus sericocaudatus and A. s. mengeli. At one time the tawny-collared nightjar (A. salvini) and Yucatan nightjar (A. badius) were also treated as subspecies of it.

== Description ==
The adult male silky-tailed nightjar has light grey-brown, vermiculated plumage with a strong blackish streak on the top of the head and the nape. It has blackish facial bristles and blackish spots with rufous on the side. Its hind-neck has narrow rufous-tawny half-collar plumage. The mantle, back, rump, and upper tail of a silky-tailed nightjar converts to blackish-brown with irregular patterns of buff and cinnamon. The breast is blackish-brown with short narrow bars of cinnamon and the belly is blackish-brown with blotches and irregular narrow bars of buff.

== Distribution and habitat ==
The nominate subspecies of silky-tailed nightjar is found in the Atlantic Forest region of southeastern Brazil, eastern Paraguay, and extreme northeastern Argentina (Misiones Province). It inhabits the interior and edges of secondary forest and subtropical evergreen forest. In elevation it ranges between 82 and 913 m (270 and 3,000 ft). A. s. mengeli is found in eastern Peru, northwestern Bolivia, and in scattered sites in Brazil's Pará state. It inhabits a variety of landscapes including mature tropical forest, terra firme forest, and lowland tropical rainforest. In elevation it ranges between 227 and 1,200 m (740 and 3,900 ft).

== Diet ==
Nightjars eat a variety of insects and the young are fed by their parents via regurgitation. Regurgitation is used by birds where it is to bring already swallowed food back up through one's throat and out the mouth to feed their young. The nestlings also forage for ground insects around the nest-site or pick up small soil granules to aid in digestion.

== Breeding and Behavior ==
The breeding period of the silky-tailed nightjar spans from August to December, which coincides with half of the dry season through the beginning of the rainy season. The courtship begins in mid-August and nests are made between early September and mid-November. They are heard vocalizing throughout the year, primarily at dawn and dusk; vocal activity increased in August and peaked in September and October, and declined in November. When the courtship begins, male nightjars will emit the usual song slightly faster. The female will fly in and perch on a nearly horizontal branch about 10 meters away. When the male sees the female, it will suddenly half the interval between notes, uttering several notes in quick succession. As the male flies to the female, he will open his tail like a fan, lower his wings against the branch and mount the female. Adult nightjars have been observed to share incubation duties with the female partner attending the nest throughout the day and the male at night. As their anti-predator behavior, injury-feigning is commonly observed during the nesting stage. Injury-feigning is a behavior that aims to fool predators and lure them away from a nest by pretending to be injured to distract the attention of the predator. Adult nightjars readily flush, which is a distraction ploy to draw the predator's attention on the adult, when approached. After flushing, adults reposition themselves, facing the same way and parallel to the trail, which provides them a larger open area to escape from potential predators. When these behaviors are observed, adults are highly obscure while the eggs are visible.

== Vocalization ==
The two subspecies of silky-tailed nightjar have significantly different songs. That of A. s. sericocaudatus is "a short tonal gliss connecting the two major pitch peaks ree-o-ree." That of A. s. mengeli "has an almost mournful, undulating doh wheo eeo." Both members of a mated pair sing, usually from a low perch or during low flight, and mostly at dawn and dusk.

== Status ==
The IUCN has assessed the silky-tailed nightjar as being of Least Concern, though it population is unknown and believed to be decreasing. No immediate threats have been identified. Because "the Atlantic Forest and the Amazon Basin [are] constantly threatened with human development...known populations of the Silky-tailed Nightjar may rapidly decline."
