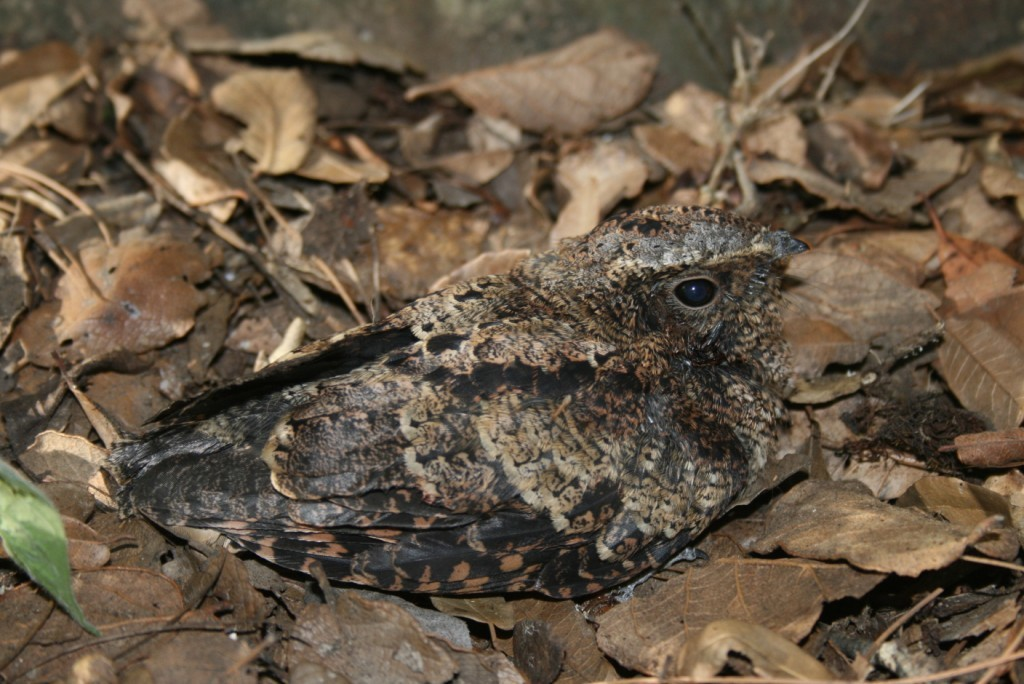

Conservation status
- Least Concern (IUCN 3.1)

Scientific classification
- Kingdom: Animalia
- Phylum: Chordata
- Class: Aves
- Order: Caprimulgiformes
- Family: Caprimulgidae
- Genus: Antrostomus
- Species: A. salvini

Binomial name
- Antrostomus salvini (Hartert, 1892)

Synonyms
- Caprimulgus salvini

= Tawny-collared nightjar =

Species of bird

The tawny-collared nightjar (Antrostomus salvini) is a species of nightjar in the family Caprimulgidae. It is endemic to Mexico.

== Taxonomy and systematics ==
The tawny-collared nightjar was originally described as Caprimulgus salvini; Antrostomus was later split as a separate genus. It and the Yucatan nightjar (A. badius) were for a time considered subspecies of the silky-tailed nightjar (A. sericocaudatus). The tawny-collared nightjar is monotypic.

== Description ==
The tawny-collared nightjar is 23 to 25.5 cm (9.1 to 10 in) long. One female weighed 56 g (2.0 oz). The male's upperparts are blackish brown; the crown has blackish spots and the back and rump have fine light brown speckles and broad blackish streaks. It has a broad tawny or buff collar on the nape and the sides of the neck that give the species its name. The tail is also dark brown and the three outermost pairs of feathers have wide white tips. The wings are brown to blackish brown with tawny spots and bars. The face is dark reddish with brown barring. The chin and throat are blackish brown with a narrow white band below the latter, the breast blackish brown with cinnamon speckles, and the belly and flanks blackish brown with many white spots. The female is similar but the tips of the tail feathers have a narrow buff band instead of the wide white one, the tawny markings on the wing are paler, and the band on the lower throat is buffy rather than white.

== Distribution and habitat ==
The tawn-collared nightjar is found in northeastern Mexico, from Nuevo León and Tamaulipas south to Veracruz. It is mostly resident but a few apparently move further south in the nonbreeding season. It inhabits arid to semihumid landscapes including brushy woodland, thorn forest, and dense scrublands. It shuns humid and heavily forested areas. In elevation it ranges from sea level to 500 m (1,600 ft).

== Behavior ==
=== Feeding ===
The tawny-collared nightjar is nocturnal. It hunts for flying insects by sallying from a perch and possibly also from the ground.

=== Breeding ===
The tawny-collared nightjar's breeding season spans from April to August. The clutch size is two eggs, probably laid directly on the ground with no nest as is common among nightjars.

=== Vocalization ===
The tawny-collared nightjar's song is "an abrupt, clipped chi-wihw' or tchi-wheeu, repeated rapidly". It is sung from a hidden perch in a bush or tree, mostly at dawn and dusk, and mostly from March through July.

== Status ==
The IUCN has assessed the tawny-collared nightjar as being of Least Concern. Its population is estimated to be at least 50,000 mature individuals but is decreasing. No immediate threats have been identified.
