= Ouch =

Ouch is an interjection that denotes pain. It may also refer to:

== Geography ==
- Ouch, Lower Dir, a town in Khyber Pakhtunkhwa, Pakistan
- Ouch (union council), an administrative unit of Lower Dir District, Pakistan
- Ouches, a commune in the Loire department in central France

== Film and TV ==
- Ouch! (1967 film), a British silent comedy film starring Peter Butterworth
- Ouch (2000 film) (Aïe), a French film directed by Sophie Fillières
- Ouch! (2004 film), an Irish comedy short starring Slaine Kelly
- Ouch (2016 film), an Indian short film

== Music ==
- Ouch! (Lake album), 1980
- Ouch! (Ohio Players album), 1981
- OUCH! (Matt Watson EP), 2020
- "Ouch" (song), a 2008 single by N-Dubz
- "Ouch!", a song by The Rutles from The Rutles
- "Ouch", a 2006 song by Be Your Own Pet
- "Ouch", a 2019 song by Bring Me the Horizon from Amo
- "Ouch", a 1988 song by Rainy Davis
- "Ouch!", a 1963 song by Ricky Allen

== Other ==
- Ouch!, a 1971 poetry collection by Peter Ackroyd
- Ouch! (gum), a brand of bubble gum from Hubba Bubba
- OUCH is the reporting mark for the Ouachita Railroad, Arkansas, USA.

== See also ==
- Ow (disambiguation)
