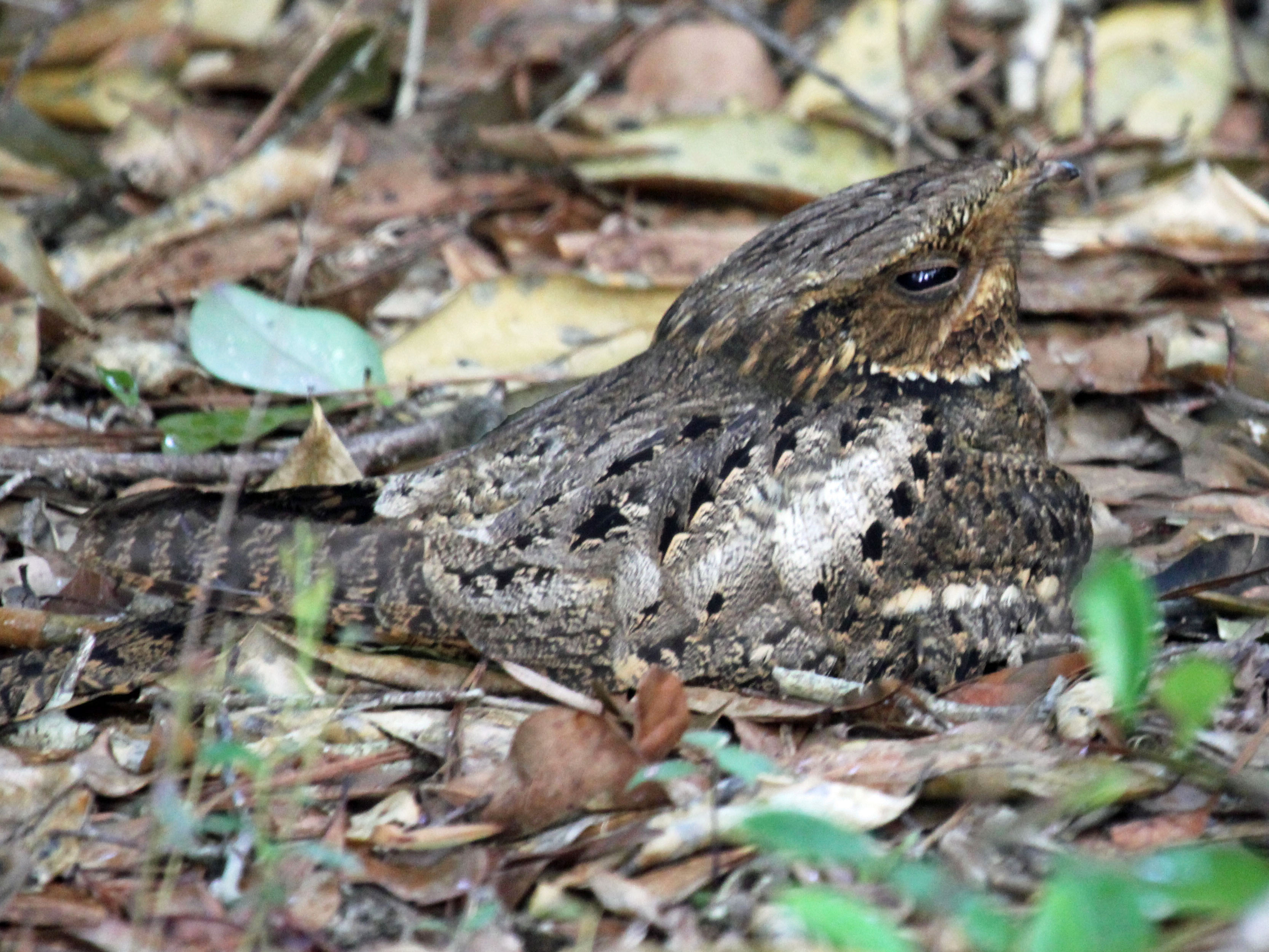
- Chuck-will's-widow (Antrostomus carolinensis)

Scientific classification
- Kingdom: Animalia
- Phylum: Chordata
- Class: Aves
- Order: Caprimulgiformes
- Family: Caprimulgidae
- Genus: Antrostomus; Bonaparte, 1838

Species
- see text.

= Antrostomus =

Genus of birds

Antrostomus is a genus of nightjars formerly included in the genus Caprimulgus. They are medium-sized nocturnal birds with long pointed wings, short legs and short bills.

Antrostomus nightjars are found in the New World, and like other nightjars they usually nest on the ground. They are mostly active in the late evening and early morning or at night, and feed predominantly on moths and other large flying insects. Most have small feet, of little use for walking, and their soft plumage is cryptically coloured to resemble bark or leaves. They have relatively long bills and rictal bristles. Some species, unusually for birds, perch along a branch, rather than across it, which helps to conceal them during the day. Temperate species are strongly migratory, wintering in the tropics. Many have repetitive and often mechanical songs.

== Taxonomy ==
These species were formerly placed in the genus Caprimulgus but were moved to the resurrected genus Antrostomus based on the results of a molecular phylogenetic study published in 2010. The genus Antrostomus was erected by the French naturalist Charles Bonaparte in 1838 with the chuck-will's-widow (Antrostomus carolinensis) as the type species. The generic name combines the Ancient Greek antron meaning "cavern" and stoma meaning "mouth".

== Species ==
The genus contains 12 species:

Image	Scientific name	Common name	Distribution
	Antrostomus carolinensis	Chuck-will's-widow	southeastern US; winters to Central and northwestern South America
	Antrostomus rufus	Rufous nightjar	sparsely across South America
	Antrostomus cubanensis	Cuban nightjar	Cuba
-	Antrostomus ekmani	Hispaniolan nightjar	Hispaniola
	Antrostomus salvini	Tawny-collared nightjar	eastern Mexico
-	Antrostomus badius	Yucatan nightjar	Yucatan peninsula
	Antrostomus sericocaudatus	Silky-tailed Nightjar	mainly southern Atlantic forest
-	Antrostomus ridgwayi	Buff-collared nightjar	southeastern Arizona to Nicaragua
	Antrostomus vociferus	Eastern whip-poor-will	eastern North America; winters to Florida and Central America
	Antrostomus arizonae	Mexican whip-poor-will	southwestern US and montane Mesoamerica
	Antrostomus noctitherus	Puerto Rican nightjar	Puerto Rico (southwest)
	Antrostomus saturatus	Dusky nightjar	Talamancan montane forests
