= Ouches =

- Commune
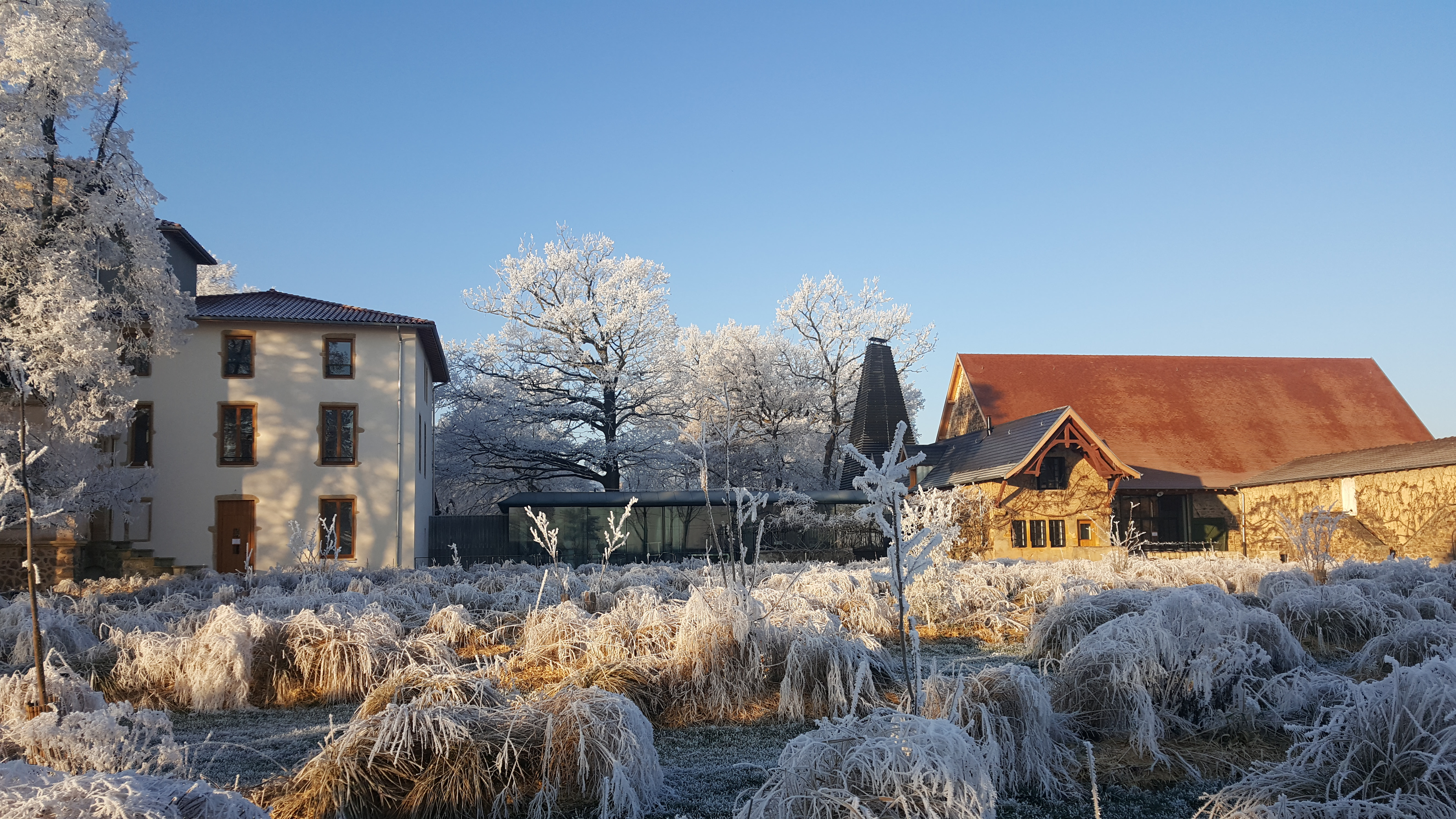

- Coat of arms
- Location of Ouches
- Location within France Location within Auvergne-Rhône-Alpes
- Coordinates: 46°01′01″N 3°59′18″E
- Country: France
- Region: Auvergne-Rhône-Alpes
- Department: Loire
- Arrondissement: Roanne
- Canton: Renaison
- Intercommunality: Roannais Agglomération

Government
  - Mayor (2020–2026): Yves Chambost
- Area^{1}: 10.12 km^{2} (3.91 sq mi)
- Elevation: 323 m (1,060 ft)
- Highest elevation: 376 m (1,234 ft)
- Lowest elevation: 295 m (968 ft)
- Population (2023): 1,138
  - Density: 112.5/km^{2} (291.2/sq mi)
- Time zone: UTC+01:00 (CET)
  - Summer (DST): UTC+02:00 (CEST)
- INSEE/Postal code: 42162 /42155
- ^{1} French Land Register data, which excludes lakes, ponds, glaciers > 1 km^{2} (0.386 sq mi or 247 acres) and river estuaries.

Ouches may be the plural of ouch.

Ouches (French pronunciation: [uʃ]) is a commune in the Loire department in central France.

== Population ==
Historical population
Year	Pop.	±% p.a.
1968	523	—
1975	753	+5.34%
1982	929	+3.05%
1990	1,002	+0.95%
1999	1,015	+0.14%
2007	1,144	+1.51%
2012	1,110	−0.60%
2017	1,158	+0.85%
2023	1,138	−0.29%
Source: INSEE

== See also ==
- Communes of the Loire department
