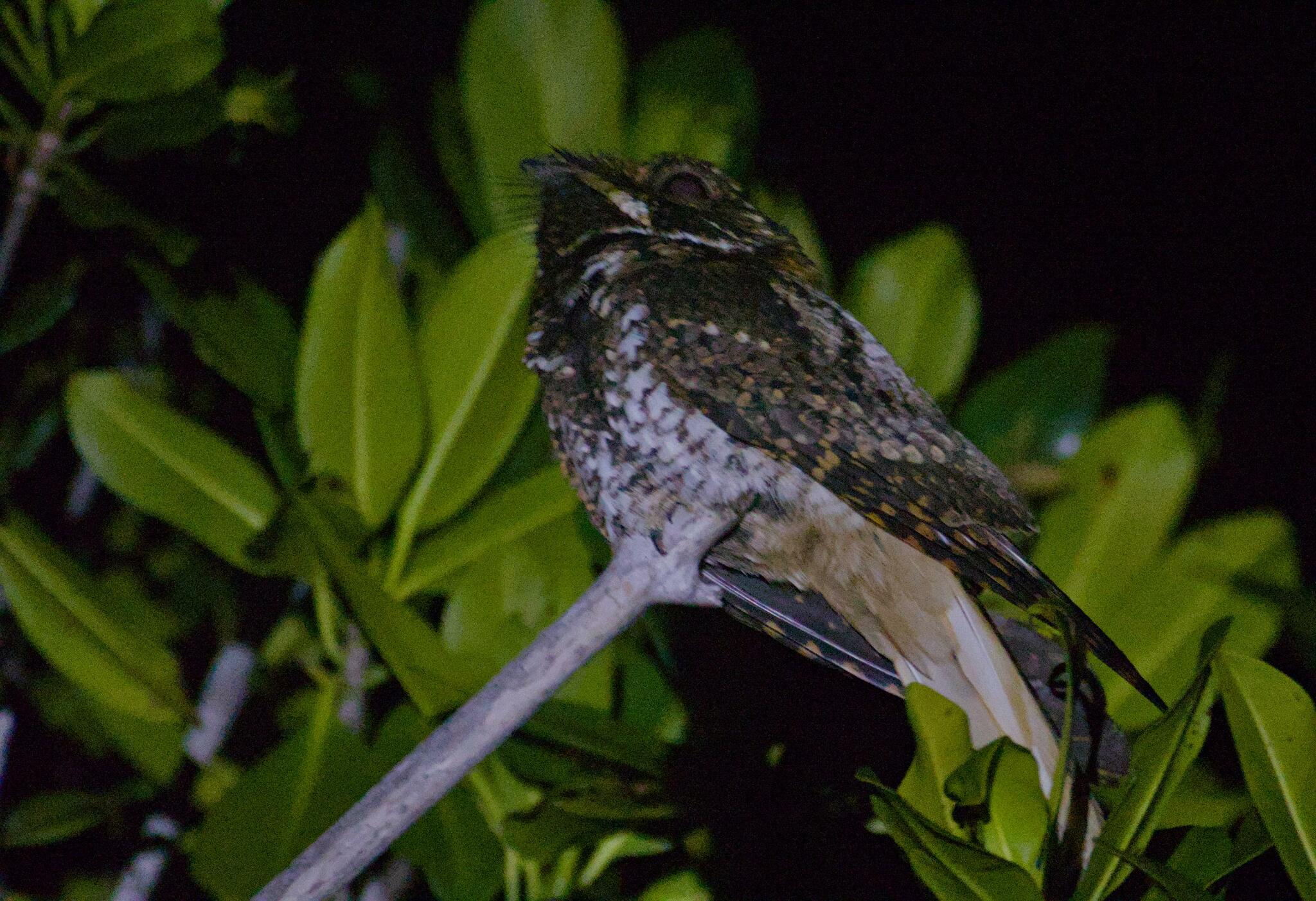

Conservation status
- Least Concern (IUCN 3.1)

Scientific classification
- Kingdom: Animalia
- Phylum: Chordata
- Class: Aves
- Order: Caprimulgiformes
- Family: Caprimulgidae
- Genus: Antrostomus
- Species: A. badius

Binomial name
- Antrostomus badius Bangs & Peck, 1908
- Year-round Nonbreeding

Synonyms
- Caprimulgus badius

= Yucatan nightjar =

Species of bird

The Yucatan nightjar (Antrostomus badius) is a species of nightjar in the family Caprimulgidae. It is found in Belize, Guatemala, Mexico, and Honduras.

== Taxonomy and systematics ==
The Yucatan nightjar was for many years classified in genus Caprimulgus but was later restored to its original genus Antrostomus. It and the tawny-collared nightjar (A. salvini) were for a time considered subspecies of the silky-tailed nightjar (A. sericocaudatus). The Yucatan nightjar is monotypic.

== Description ==
The Yucatan nightjar is 24 to 25.5 cm (9.4 to 10 in) long. One male weighed 65.5 g (2.3 oz) and three females 51.2 to 64.3 g (1.8 to 2.3 oz). The male's upperparts are grayish brown. The crown has blackish brown spots and grayish white speckles, and the back and rump have buff and cinnamon speckles and broad blackish brown streaks. It has a broad tawny or buff collar on the nape and the sides of the neck. The tail is brown with faint tawny bars; the three outermost pairs of feathers have wide white tips and the innermost pair grayish brown mottling on the tips. The wings are brown to grayish brown with tawny spots and bars. The face is tawny with blackish brown speckles. The chin and throat are dark brown with cinnamon bars and a narrow white band below the latter. The breast is brown with buff and cinnamon speckles, and the belly and flanks are blackish brown with cinnamon speckles, brown bars, and many white spots. The female is similar to the male but the pale tips of the outer tail feathers are much smaller and buff, not white.

== Distribution and habitat ==
The Yucatan nightjar is a year-round resident of Mexico's Yucatán Peninsula and Cozumel off its coast. It is a nonbreeding visitor to Belize and northwestern Honduras, and there are a few reports from northern Guatemala in that season as well. It inhabits "scrub and brushy woodland [and] forest edge".

== Behavior ==
=== Feeding ===
The Yucatan nightjar is nocturnal. It hunts for flying insects by sallying from a perch and possibly also from the ground.

=== Breeding ===
The Yucatan nightjar's breeding season has not been defined. The clutch size is two eggs, probably laid directly on the ground with no nest as is common among nightjars.

=== Vocalization ===
The Yucatan nightjar's song is "a loud, clear puc ree-u-reeeu' or pc weeu wee-weeeu. It is sung from a hidden perch in a bush or tree, mostly from February through August. It also makes a "hard, hollow clucking, k-lok k-lok ... or p-tok ...."

== Status ==
The IUCN has assessed the Yucatan nightjar as being of Least Concern. Its population is estimated to be at least 50,000 mature individuals but is decreasing. No immediate threats have been identified.
