= Remé-Antonia Grefalda =

Filipina author

Remé-Antonia Grefalda is the author of baring more than soul: poems and The Other Blue Book: On The High Seas of Discovery, and co-author of a Ford Foundation report, Towards A Cultural Community: Identity, Education and Stewardship in Filipino American Performing Arts. She is the recipient of the Philippines Palanca Award for her full-length play, In the Matter of Willie Grayson, produced and staged at Howard University in Washington, D.C.

She is the founder and editor of Our Own Voice and the Washington D.C.–based Qbd Ink theater group, as well as founding director of the Asian and Pacific Islander Collection at the Library of Congress.
