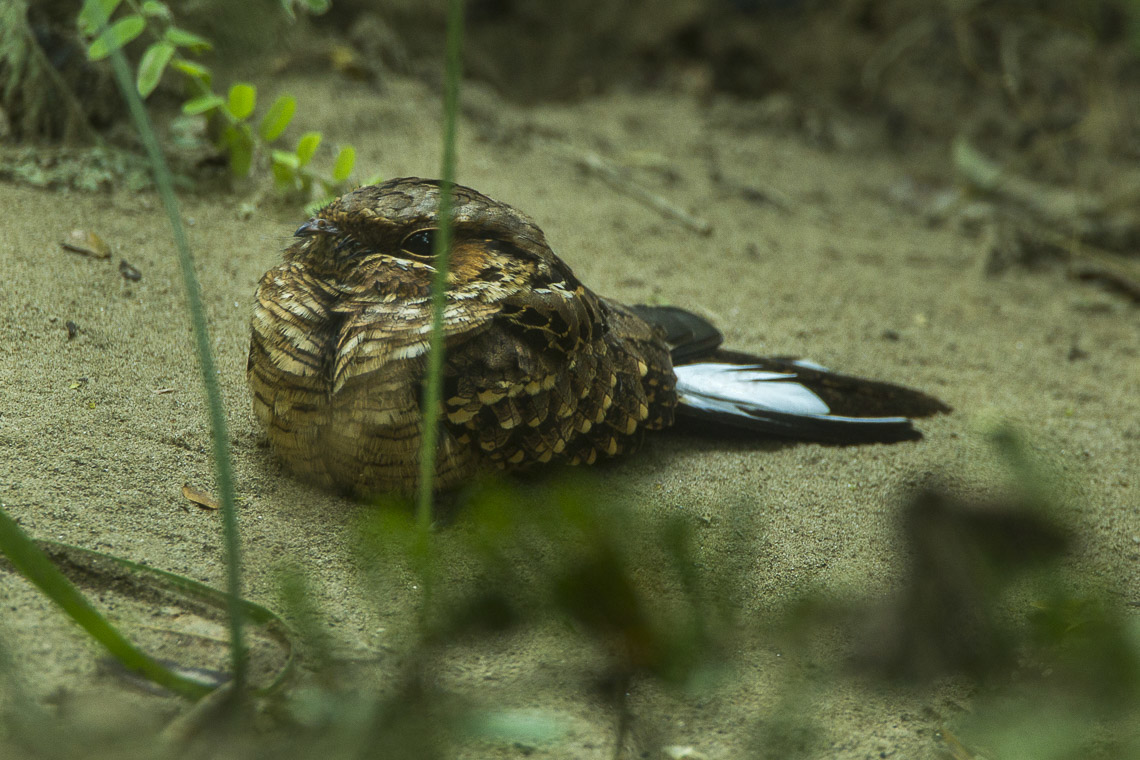

Conservation status
- Least Concern (IUCN 3.1)

Scientific classification
- Kingdom: Animalia
- Phylum: Chordata
- Class: Aves
- Clade: Strisores
- Order: Caprimulgiformes
- Family: Caprimulgidae
- Genus: Antrostomus
- Species: A. ridgwayi

Binomial name
- Antrostomus ridgwayi Nelson, 1897
- Range Breeding Year-round

Synonyms
- Caprimulgus ridgwayi

= Buff-collared nightjar =

Species of bird

The buff-collared nightjar or Ridgway's whip-poor-will (Antrostomus ridgwayi) is a species of nightjar in the family Caprimulgidae. It is found in Guatemala, Honduras, Mexico, Nicaragua, and the U.S. state of Arizona.

== Taxonomy and systematics ==
The buff-collared nightjar has two subspecies, the nominate Antrostomus ridgwayi ridgwayi and A. r. troglodytes. For a time it was included in genus Caprimulgus but was later restored to its original genus.

== Description ==
The buff-collared nightjar is 22 to 23 cm (8.7 to 9.1 in) long. "A. r. ridgwayi" weigh 39.8 to 61.0 g (1.4 to 2.2 oz); one male A. r. troglodytes weighed 51.0 g (1.8 oz). The head, upperparts, and tail are brownish gray with gray, cream, and rust markings. It has a bright cinnamon buff collar on the hindneck and a narrow buffy white band under the throat. The wings are brownish black with cinnamon buff bands. The breast is brownish gray and the belly tan with dark brown bars. The ends of the two outermost tail feathers have much white in the male and a small amount of buff in the female.

== Distribution and habitat ==
The nominate subspecies of buff-collared nightjar breeds from southeastern Arizona south through central Mexico to Morelos; it migrates from that area in winter. It is a year round resident in western Mexico from southern Sonora to Chiapas. A. r. troglodytes is a year round resident of Guatemala, Honduras, and possibly Nicaragua. They inhabit a variety of landscapes including thickly vegetated ravines and canyons in the arid north and thorn scrub and moister pine-oak woodlands to the south. In the U.S. it is typically found between 933 and 1,400 m (3,100 and 4,600 ft) of elevation. It nests as low as sea level and as high as 3,000 m (9,800 ft) in Mexico, and in Honduras is found between 900 and 1,650 m (3,000 and 5,400 ft).

== Behavior ==
The buff-collared nightjar is most active at dawn and dusk but is also nocturnal. During the day it roosts on the ground under low vegetation, typically on steep ground with its head pointing downhill.

=== Feeding ===
The buff-collared nightjar forages by flying from a perch or the ground to as high as 10 m (33 ft) and returns to the same spot. It hunts from dusk well into the night and again near dawn. Its diet of nocturnal flying insects has not been detailed.

=== Breeding ===
The buff-collared nightjar's breeding season has not been fully defined but includes at least April to June. The clutch of two eggs is laid directly on the ground without a nest, though larger rocks may be pushed away. It is typically in a shady spot. There is at least one observation of an adult giving a broken-wing display, apparently to distract two canyon walkers from its nest.

=== Vocalization ===
The male buff-collared nightjar's song is a "long rising, accelerating series of cuk notes ending in cuk-a-cheea that drops suddenly at the end." Both sexes make "chuck" calls; males give a "quirr" call. It typically sings the most at dawn and dusk but will continue intermittently through the night. It sings nightly between mid May and early August and infrequently during the rest of the year.

== Status ==
The IUCN has assessed the buff-collared nightjar as being of Least Concern. It has a very large range and an estimated population of 2,000,000, though that number is believed to be decreasing. No immediate threats have been determined. There is potential for habitat loss in Mexico; virtually all of its tiny U.S. range is protected in some way from that threat.
