= Pobblebonk =

Pobblebonk may refer to:

- Limnodynastes dorsalis, a frog found in Southwest Australia
- Limnodynastes dumerilii, found in Eastern Australia

and may also refer to:

- Scarlet-sided pobblebonk, Limnodynastes terraereginae
