= Tick, Tick, Tick =

Tick, Tick, Tick may refer to:

- Tick, Tick, Tick (film), a 1970 film starring Jim Brown
- "Tick, Tick, Tick..." (Castle), an episode of American TV series Castle
- "Tick-Tick-Tick" (Kim Possible), an episode from the first season of the television show Kim Possible
- "Tick Tick Tick" (How I Met Your Mother), an episode from the seventh season of the television show How I Met Your Mother
- Tik Tik Tik (1981 film) (also known as Tick! Tick! Tick!), a Tamil crime film
- Tik Tik Tik (2018 film), a Tamil science-fiction film
- Tick...Tick...Tick...: The Long Life & Turbulent Times of 60 Minutes, a 2004 book by David Blum
