= Khilkhilat =

- Gujarati: ખિલખિલાટ
- Commercial?: No
- Country: India
- Launched: 2012; Gujarat

Khilkhilat (lit. 'giggles') is the name given to a special kind of ambulance in the state of Gujarat in India. Khilkhilat ambulances are specially designed to drop the mother and the newborn child at their home free of cost.

== History ==
Khilkilat ambulance service was started in Gujarat in September 2012 by the state's then Chief Minister Narendra Modi. The project was launched in collaboration with GVK EMRI, a non-profit organisation. During the launch 20 ambulance vans were prepared to provide service and more ambulances were added gradually. In 2012, initially, the project budget was ₹2 billion (US$23 million).

== Features ==
Khilkhilat ambulances are pink in color, with cartoons over its body, and funny horn that sounds like a laughing child's voice. It does not a have siren as in common ambulances. This ambulance also provides nutrition kit for the newly born and it also includes list of vaccines to be given at specific times and information about nearby government hospitals. Khilkhilat ambulance is fitted with cushions and LCD screen giving information to the mother and her relatives about childcare.

== Other projects ==
Khilkhilat inspired launching of similar projects in other Indian states. In 2015 Maharashtra health department announced to launch Vatsalaya with a similar task to provide free transport to newly born children and their mothers.
