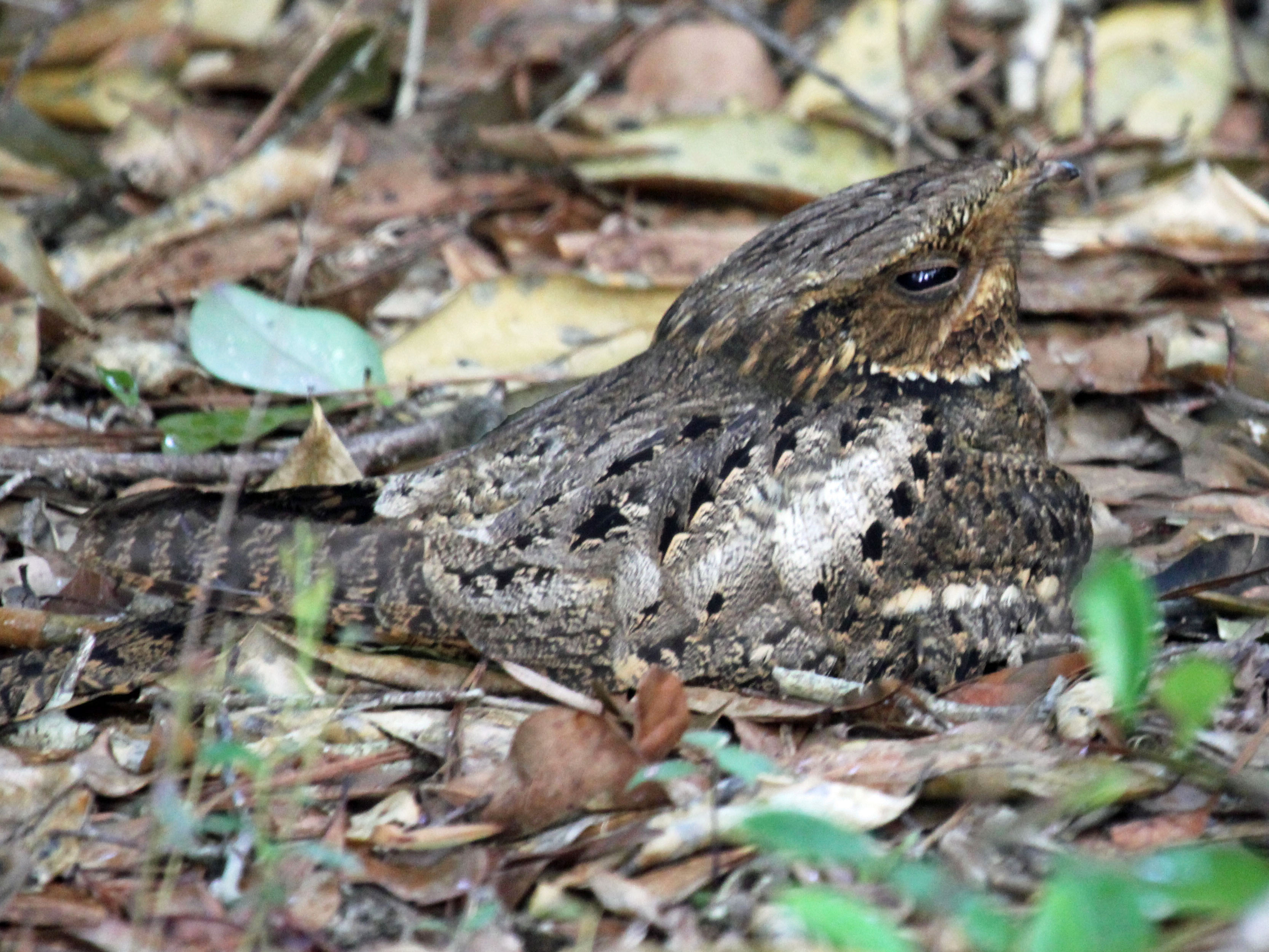
- Female

Conservation status
- Near Threatened (IUCN 3.1)

- Secure (NatureServe)

Scientific classification
- Kingdom: Animalia
- Phylum: Chordata
- Class: Aves
- Order: Caprimulgiformes
- Family: Caprimulgidae
- Genus: Antrostomus
- Species: A. carolinensis

Binomial name
- Antrostomus carolinensis (Gmelin, JF, 1789)
- Breeding Resident Nonbreeding

Synonyms
- Caprimulgus carolinensis

Audio
- Song

= Chuck-will's-widow =

Species of bird

The chuck-will's-widow (Antrostomus carolinensis) is a nocturnal bird of the nightjar family Caprimulgidae. It is mostly found in the southeastern United States (with disjunct populations in Long Island, New York; Ontario, Canada; and Cape Cod, Massachusetts) near swamps, rocky uplands, and pine woods. It migrates to the West Indies, Central America, and northwestern South America.

== Taxonomy ==
The chuck-will's-widow was formally described in 1789 by the German naturalist Johann Friedrich Gmelin in his revised and expanded edition of Carl Linnaeus's Systema Naturae. He placed it with all the other nightjars in the genus Caprimulgus and coined the binomial name Caprimulgus carolinensis. Gmelin based his description on those of earlier authors including the "Goat-sucker of Carolina" that had been described and illustrated by the English naturalist Mark Catesby in his The Natural History of Carolina, Florida and the Bahama Islands that was published between 1729 and 1732. Chuck-will's-widow is now placed with 11 other species in the genus Antrostomus that was erected by the French naturalist Charles Bonaparte in 1838. The generic name combines the Ancient Greek antron meaning "cavern" and stoma meaning "mouth". The specific epithet carolinensis is from the toponym Carolina. The type locality is South Carolina. The species is monotypic: no subspecies are recognised.

The common English name "chuck-will's-widow " is an onomatopoeia from the bird's song. Alternative names include "chuckwuts-widow" and "chip-fell-out-of-a-oak".

This bird is sometimes confused with the better-known whippoorwill (Antrostomus vociferus), because of their similar calls and unusual names. Though rather closely related, they are two distinct species.

== Description ==
The chuck-will's-widow has a short bill and a long tail typical of the nightjars. It has mottled brownish underparts, a buff throat, reddish-brown feathers lined with black, and brown and white patterning on head and chest. Males have patches of white on their outer tail feathers. It is the largest nightjar in North America. In length, it ranges from 28 to 33 cm (11 to 13 in). The wingspan can range from 58 to 66 cm (23 to 26 in). The body mass of the species is from 66 to 188 g (2.3 to 6.6 oz). Among standard measurements, the wing chord is 20.1 to 22.5 cm (7.9 to 8.9 in), the tail is 13 to 15.1 cm (5.1 to 5.9 in), the bill is 1.1 to 1.4 cm (0.43 to 0.55 in) and the tarsus is 1.5 to 1.9 cm (0.59 to 0.75 in).

The repetitive song is often heard at night. It consists of a series of calls with a vibrating middle note between two shorter notes, not much shifting in pitch. It is slower, lower-pitched and less piercing than the song of the whip-poor-will.

== Behavior and ecology ==
=== Diet ===
It eats primarily insects, particularly those active at night such as moths, beetles, and winged ants. It will also eat small birds and bats, swallowing them whole.

=== Breeding ===
The eggs are laid on patches of dead leaves on the ground. They are pink with spots of brown and lavender and are incubated by the female.

== Gallery ==
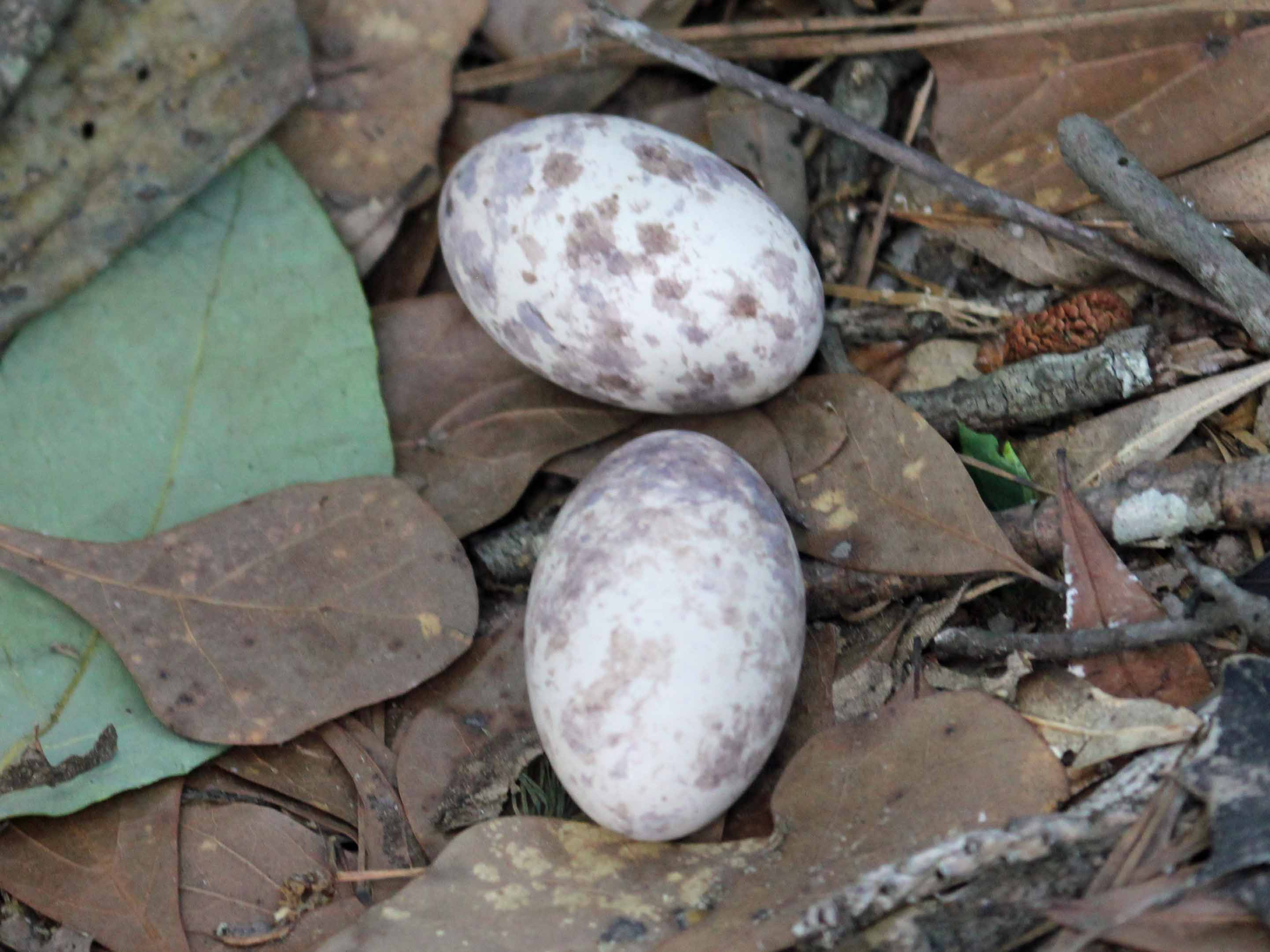
Eggs on leaves

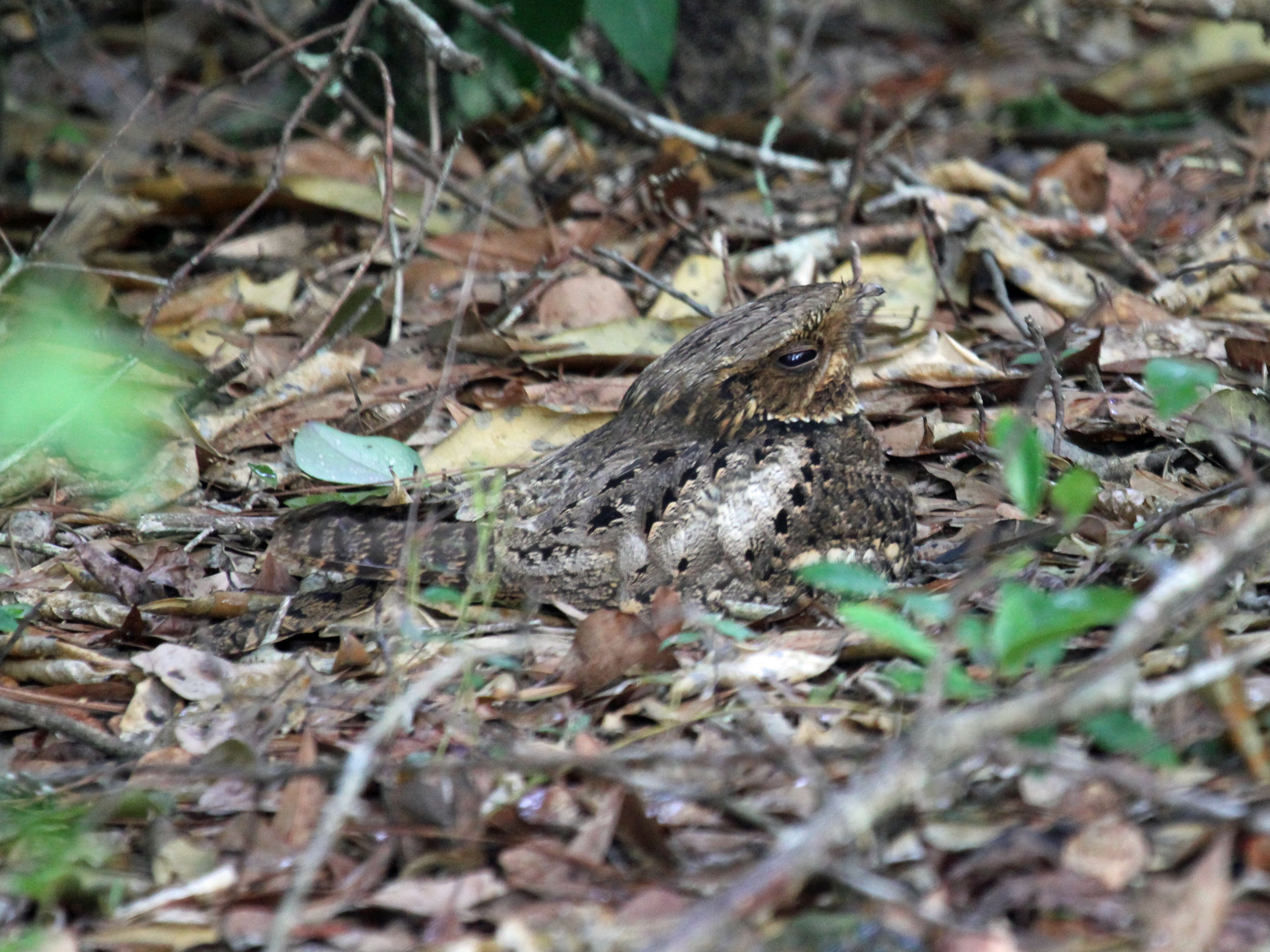
Camouflaged female on nest

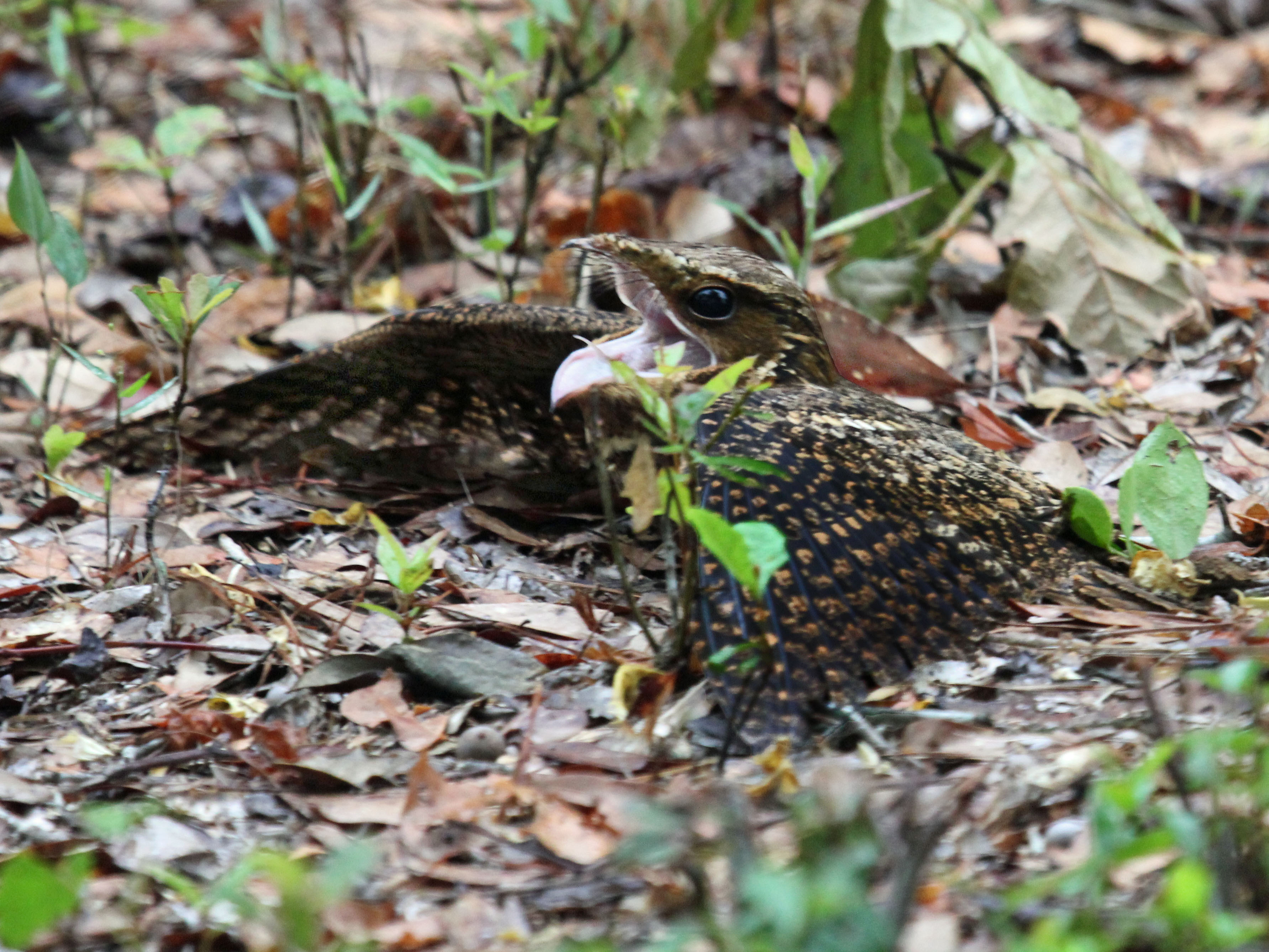
Mimicking a Cottonmouth snake

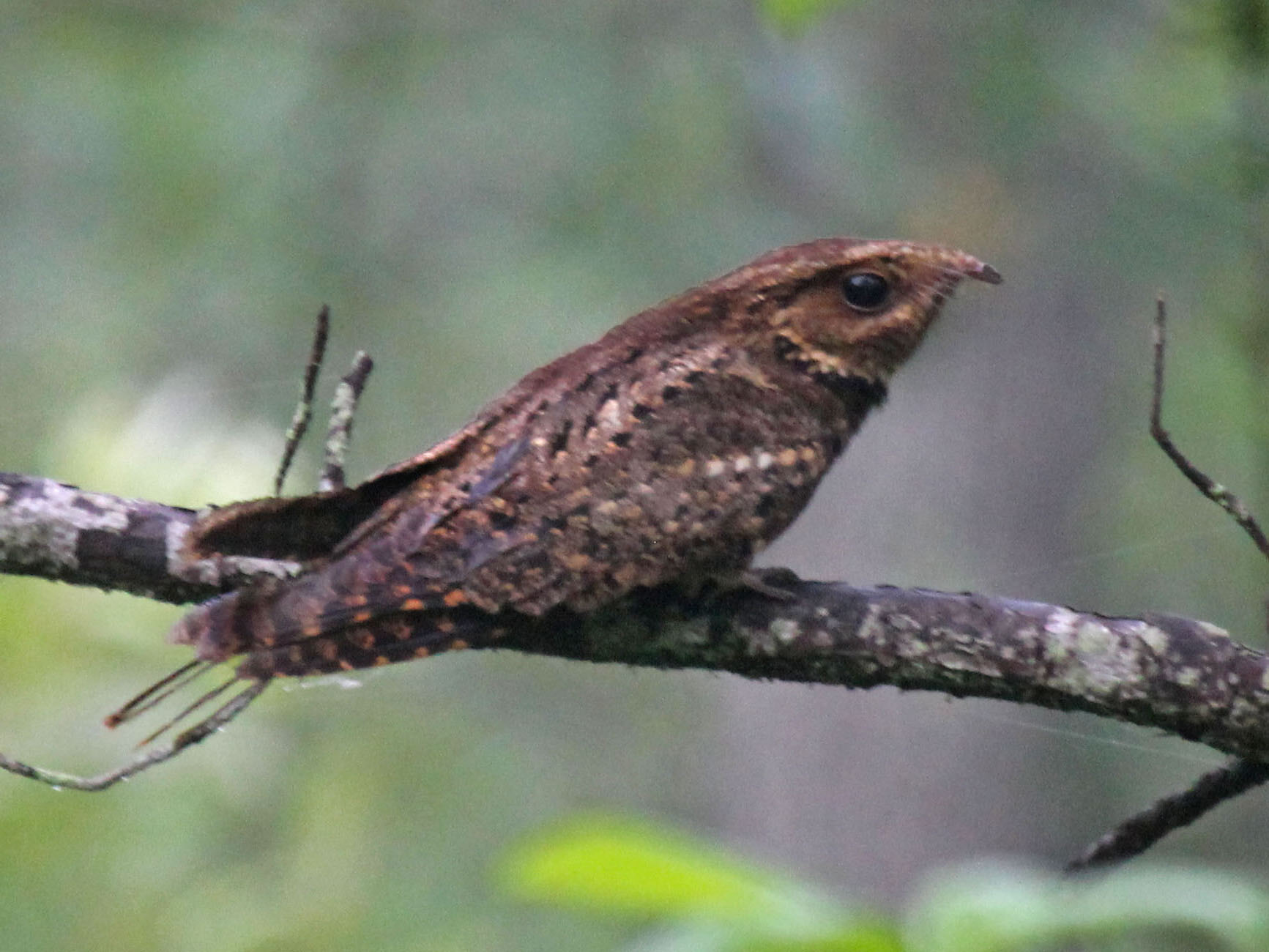
Perched on a branch

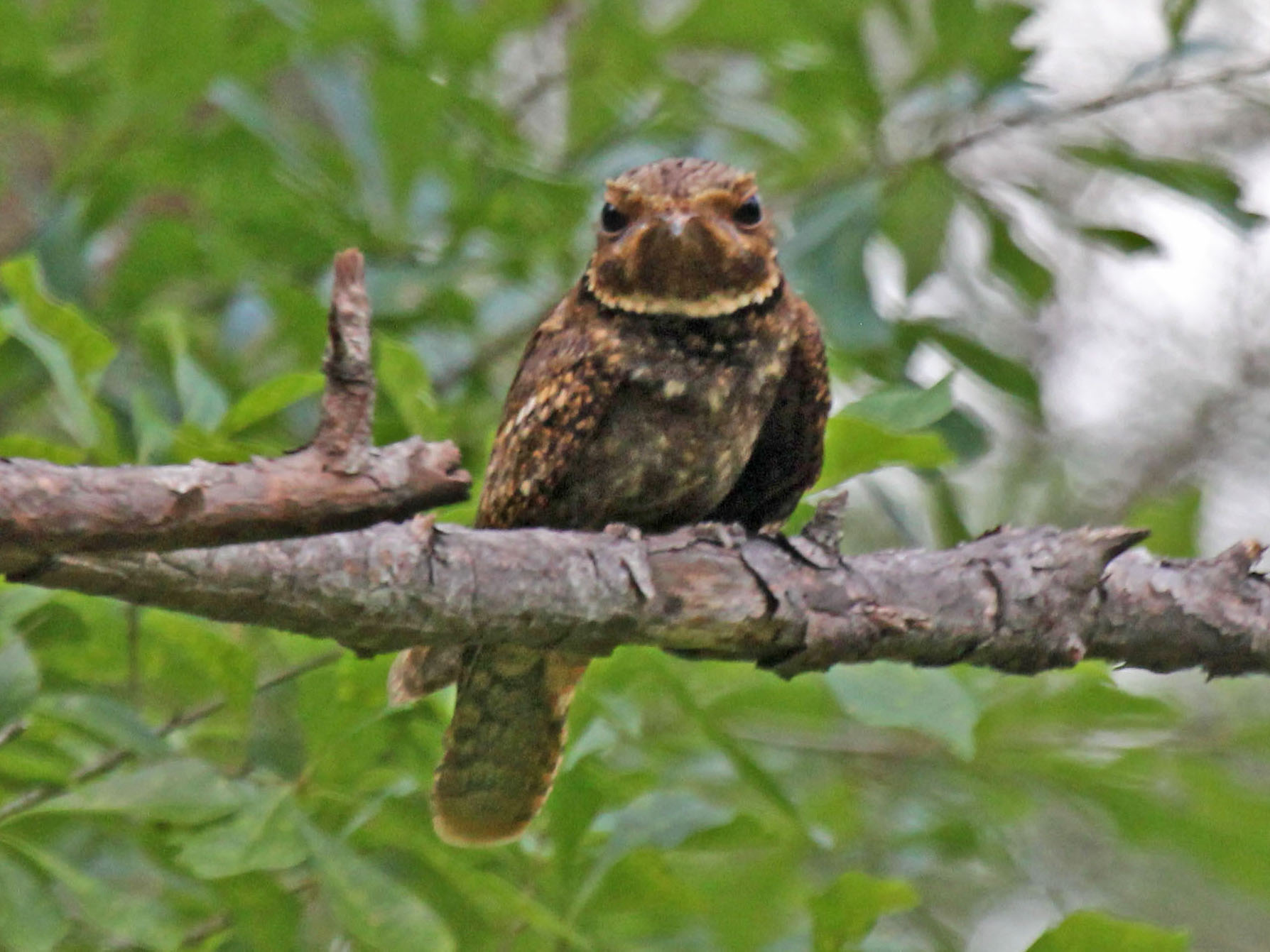
Perched on a branch

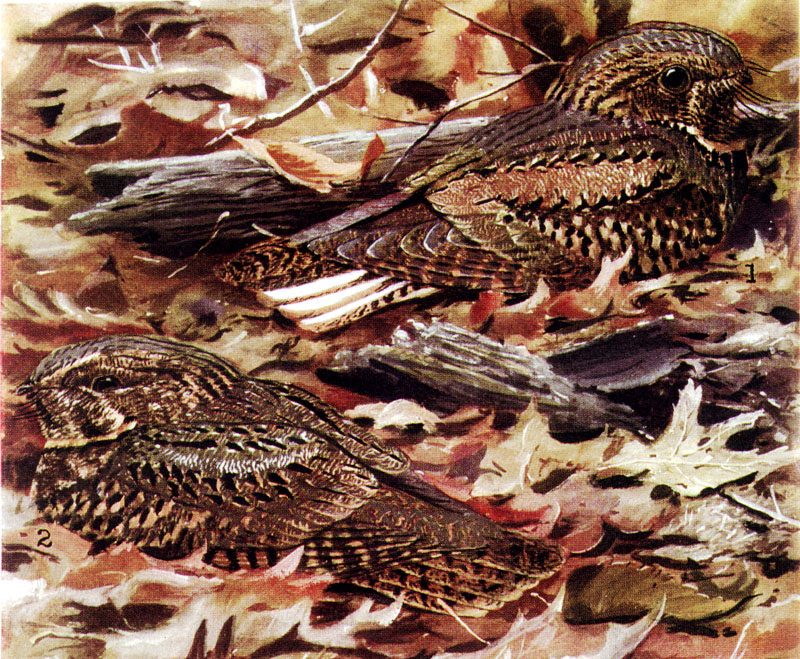
Adult male (upper right) and female (lower left)

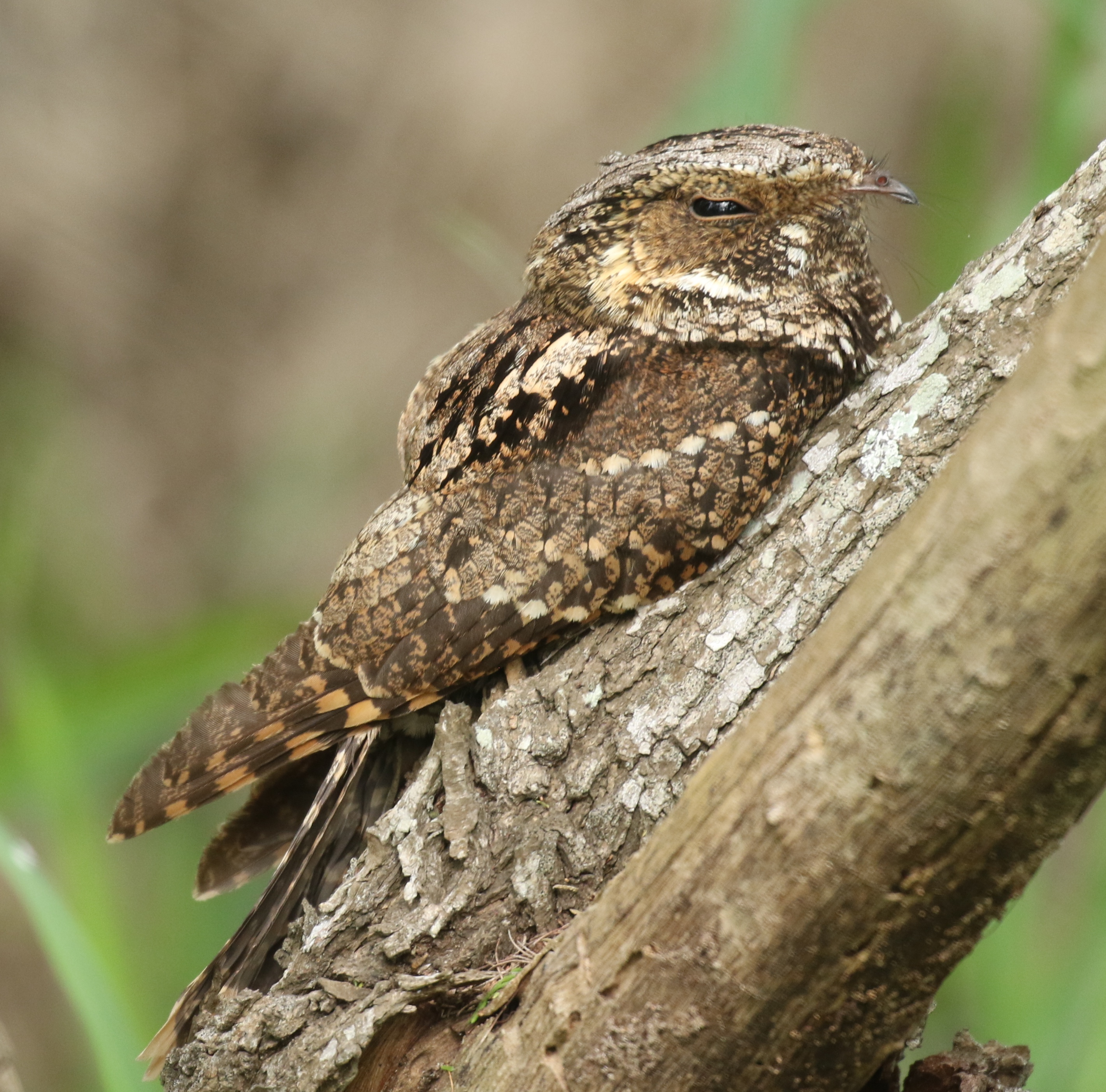
South Padre Island - Texas

== Sources ==
- Henninger, W.F. (1906). "A preliminary list of the birds of Seneca County, Ohio" (PDF). Wilson Bulletin. 18 (2): 47–60.
