= Our Own Voice Literary Journal: Beyond Homeland =

Our Own Voice is an online literary journal established in 2001 providing a home space for the creative expressions of Filipinos in the diaspora. It is founded by award-winning playwright and community activist, Remé-Antonia Grefalda. The Boatman trademark logo is designed by theater artist and web designer, Geejay Arriola. Our Own Voice, or OOV, publishes original poetry, short stories, and essays. Past issues tackled themes such as "Heirloom Recipes" (December 2011) and "Dislocation" (September 2016).

In 2003, OOV established the Global Filipino Literary Awards to recognize publishers and authors for advancing Filipino literature. Winning works are catalogued as a special collection at the Library of Congress, Asian Division.

In the September 2016 issue, the editors announced that, "The Boatman is moving 'Beyond Homeland.' After 16 years and 44 issues [featuring] works relating to Filipino heritage, OOV is “navigating” out of archipelagic waters to venture into the 'open sea.'"
