= List of post-nominal letters (Italy) =

Post-nominal letters in Italy include:

Office	Post-nominal
Order of Merit of the Italian Republic	OMRI
Military Order of Italy	OMI
Order of Merit for Labour	OML
Order of the Star of Italy	OSI
Order of Vittorio Veneto	OVV
Supreme Order of the Most Holy Annunciation	OSSA
Order of Saints Maurice and Lazarus	OSSML
Order of the Crown of Italy	OCI
Civil Order of Savoy	OCS
Colonial Order of the Star of Italy	OCSI, CGCCI, GUCI, CCI, UCI, CI
Order of the Roman Eagle	OARom.

== See also ==
- Lists of post-nominal letters
