= Eastern whip-poor-will =

- Eastern Whip-poor-will in Central Park

Conservation status
- Near Threatened (IUCN 3.1)

- Secure (NatureServe)

Scientific classification
- Kingdom: Animalia
- Phylum: Chordata
- Class: Aves
- Order: Caprimulgiformes
- Family: Caprimulgidae
- Genus: Antrostomus
- Species: A. vociferus

Binomial name
- Antrostomus vociferus (Wilson, 1812)
- Breeding Migration Nonbreeding

Synonyms
- Caprimulgus vociferus Wilson, 1812

Audio
- Namesake vocalization

Species of bird

The eastern whip-poor-will (Antrostomus vociferus; also called "whip-o-will", "whip o' will", etc.) is a medium-sized (22–27 cm or 8.7–10.6 in) bird within the nightjar family, Caprimulgidae, from North America. The whip-poor-will is commonly heard within its range, but less often seen due to its disruptive camouflage. It is named onomatopoeically after its song.

== Description ==
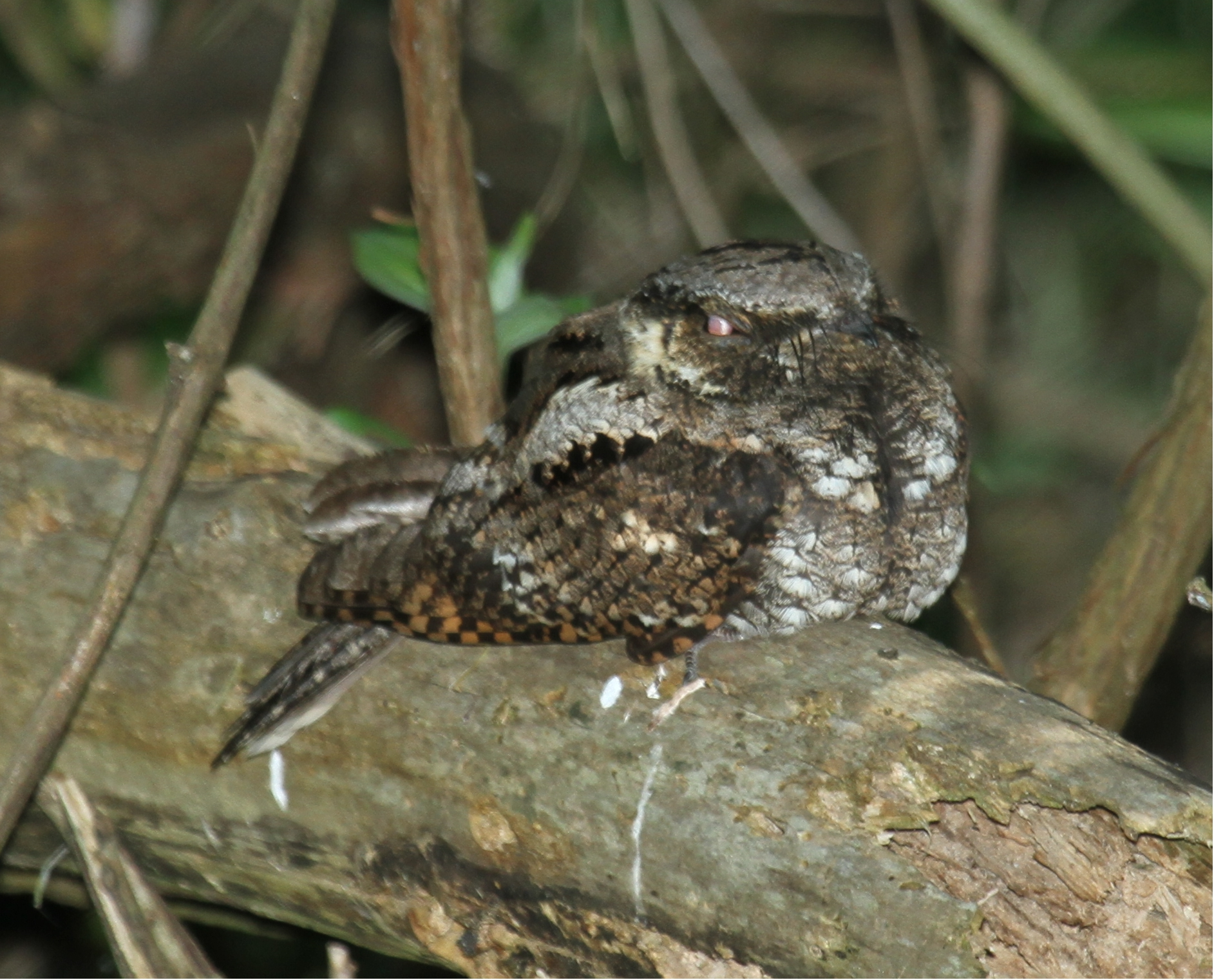
Magee Marsh - Ohio (flash photo)

This medium-sized nightjar measures 22–27 cm (8 1/2–10 1/2 in) in length, spans 45–50 cm (17 1/2–19 1/2 in) across the wings and weighs 42–69 g (1 1/2–2 7/16 oz). Further standard measurements are a wing chord of 14.7 to 16.9 cm (5 13/16 to 6 5/8 in), a tail of 10.5 to 12.8 cm (4 1/8 to 5 1/16 in), a bill of 1 to 1.4 cm (3/8 to 9/16 in) and a tarsus of 1.5 to 1.8 cm (9/16 to 11/16 in). Adults have mottled plumage: the upperparts are grey, black and brown; the lower parts are grey and black. They have a very short bill and a black throat. Males have a white patch below the throat and white tips on the outer tail feathers; in the female, these parts are light brown.

This bird is sometimes confused with the related chuck-will's-widow (Antrostomus carolinensis) which has a similar but lower-pitched and slower call.

== Ecology ==
Eastern whip-poor-wills breed in deciduous or mixed woods across central and southeastern Canada and the eastern United States, and migrate to the southeastern United States and to eastern Mexico and Central America for the winter. These birds forage at night, catching insects in flight, and normally sleep during the day. Eastern whip-poor-wills nest on the ground, in shaded locations among dead leaves, and usually lay two eggs at a time. The bird will commonly remain on the nest unless almost stepped upon.

Eastern whip-poor-will are typically socially monogamous. However, a male whip-poor-will was once recorded attending the nests of two different females, possibly because one female's previous mate had recently died.

The whip-poor-will has been split into two species. Eastern populations are now referred to as the eastern whip-poor-will. The disjunct population in southwestern United States and Mexico is now referred to as the Mexican whip-poor-will, Antrostomus arizonae. The two populations were split based on range, different vocalizations, different egg coloration, and DNA sequencing showing differentiation.

== Diet ==
The diet of an Eastern whip-poor-will mostly consists of insects, especially moths, also beetles, mosquitoes, and many others.

== Conservation ==
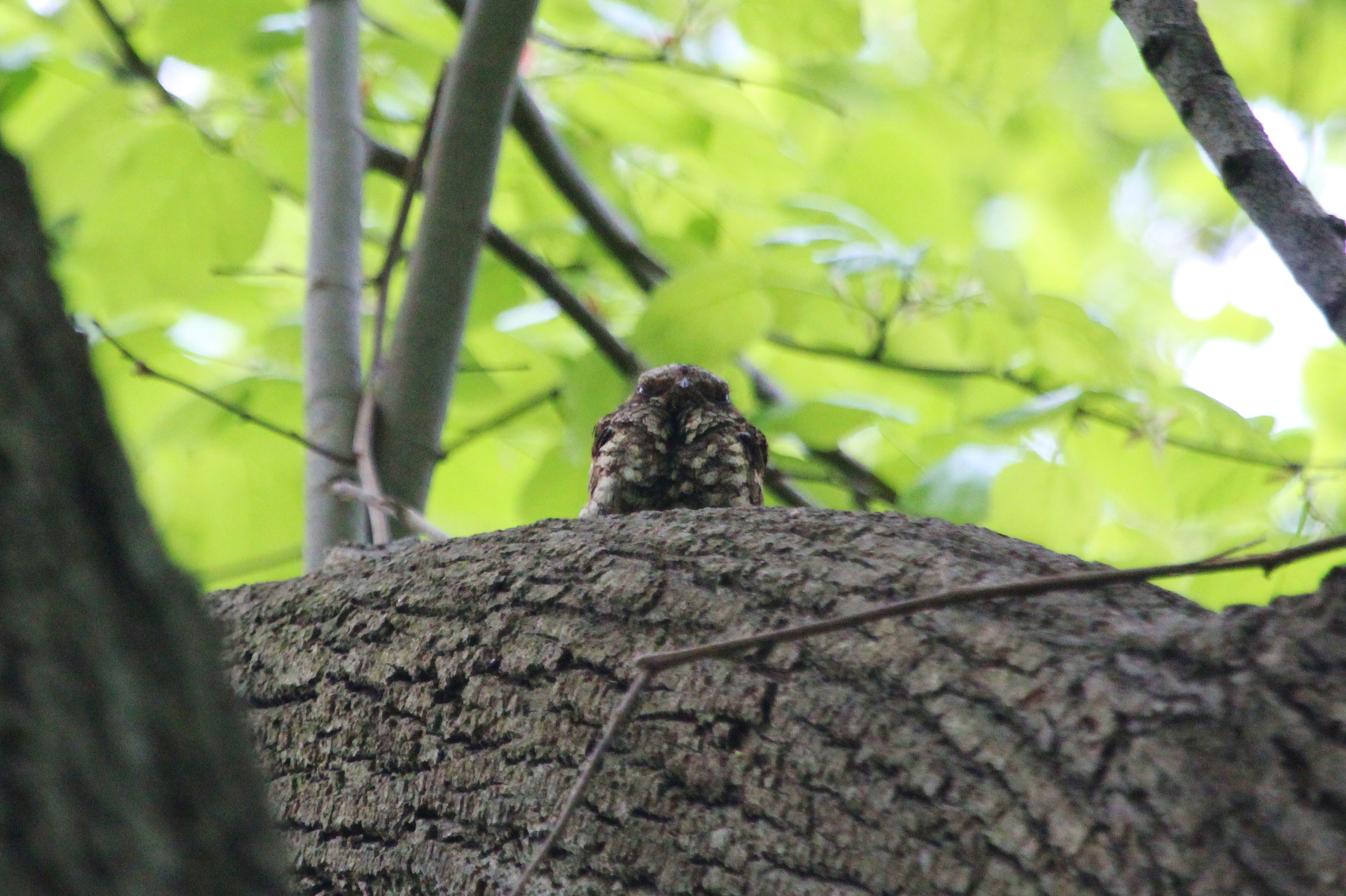
A rarely seen eastern whip-poor-will by day in Philadelphia, Pennsylvania

The eastern whip-poor-will is currently in decline, though they remain fairly common. In 2017, the eastern whip-poor-will was uplisted from least concern to near threatened on the IUCN Red List on the basis of citizen science observations demonstrating a decline in populations of the eastern whip-poor-will by over 60% between 1970 and 2014. Several reasons for the decline are proposed, such as loss of early successional forest habitat related to fire suppression and habitat destruction, predation by feral cats and dogs, and poisoning by insecticides, but the actual causes remain elusive. Pesticides and intensified agriculture have led to declines in the flying insect populations that the eastern whip-poor-will depends on. BirdLife International has stated that initiatives like the Conservation Reserve Program will be crucial in conserving the species and reversing its decline.

== Cultural references ==
Due to its song, the eastern whip-poor-will is the topic of numerous legends. A New England legend says the whip-poor-will can sense a soul departing, and can capture it as it flees. This is used as a plot device in H. P. Lovecraft's story The Dunwich Horror. Lovecraft based this idea on information of local legends given to him by Edith Miniter of North Wilbraham, Massachusetts, when he visited her in 1928. This is likely related to an earlier Native American and general American folk belief that the singing of the birds is a death omen. This is also referred by "Whip-poor-will", a short story by James Thurber, in which the constant nighttime singing of a whip-poor-will results in maddening insomnia of the protagonist, Mr. Kinstrey, who eventually loses his mind and kills everyone in his house, including himself. The bird also features in "The Runaway Slave at Pilgrim's Point", a poem by the English poet Elizabeth Barrett Browning, in which the outcast speaker asks: "Could the whip-poor-will or the cat of the glen/Look into my eyes and be bold?"

It is also frequently used as an auditory symbol of rural America, as in Washington Irving's story "The Legend of Sleepy Hollow", or as a plot device. For example, William Faulkner's short story, "Barn Burning", makes several mentions of whip-poor-wills: "and then he found that he had been asleep because he knew it was almost dawn, the night almost over. He could tell that from the whip-poor-wills. They were everywhere now among the dark trees below him, constant and inflectioned and ceaseless, so that, as the instant for giving over to the day birds drew nearer and nearer, there was no interval at all between them."

"The Mountain Whippoorwill" is a poem written by Stephen Vincent Benét about a fiddling contest, won by Hillbilly Jim, who refers to his fiddle as a whip-poor-will and identifies the bird with the lonely and poor but vibrant life of the mountain people. American poet Robert Frost described the sound of a whip-poor-will in the fourth stanza of his 1915 poem "Ghost House". This is notable in Frost's use of assonance in "The whippoorwill is coming to shout / And hush and cluck and flutter about".

Emily Dickinson wrote "Many a phrase has the English language - / I have heard but one - / Low as the laughter of the Cricket, / Loud, as the Thunder's Tongue - / Murmuring, like old Caspian Choirs, / When the Tide's a'lull - / Saying itself in new inflection - / Like a Whippowil -"

The chorus of George A. Whiting and Walter Donaldson's song "My Blue Heaven" (1927) begins, "When Whip-poor-wills call and ev'ning is nigh".

In the 1934 Frank Capra film It Happened One Night, before Clark Gable's character Peter Warne reveals his name to Ellie Andrews (Claudette Colbert), he famously says to her, "I am the whip-poor-will that cries in the night".

Hank Williams's 1949 song I'm So Lonesome I Could Cry refers to the whip-poor-will's sound in its opening line: "Hear that lonesome whippoorwill, he sounds too blue to fly". The chorus of Alan Jackson's 1992 single Midnight in Montgomery makes reference to this lyric: "Just hear that whippoorwill".

In the 1958 movie Thunder Road, Keely Smith sings "The Whippoorwill," a song written by Robert Mitchum and Don Raye.

Elton John and Bernie Taupin's 1975 song "Philadelphia Freedom" features a flute mimicking the call of the eastern whip-poor-will and includes the lyrics "I like living easy without family ties, till the whippoorwill of freedom zapped me right between the eyes."

The Pennsylvania-based Indie rock band Dr. Dog released their song "Lonesome" on their 2012 album Be the Void, featuring the passage "I had my fill of the Whippoorwill / When he broke into song I shot him".

Composed in Cape Cod in the spring of 1945, Bohuslav Martinů’s Sonata for Flute and Piano, H. 306, features the call of the eastern whip-poor-will as a recurring theme in its third movement.

The song, "Cockeyed Optimist", sung by Nellie Forbush in Rodger's and Hammerstein's South Pacific, mentions such bird, singing, "But every whip-poor-will / Is selling me a bill/ And telling me it just ain't so!"

In the novel Slapstick by Kurt Vonnegut, the narrator hears the call of a whip-poor-will, which the narrator referred to as a child as "The Nocturnal Goatsucker".

In the fifth episode of the Netflix animated series The Midnight Gospel, titled "Annihilation of Joy", the protagonist encounters a talking bird attached to a prisoner. The bird, voiced by Jason Louv, introduces itself as a "psychopomp or a whippoorwill" and explains the cycle of death and rebirth experienced by its charge, a prisoner caught in an "existential trap".

The whip-poor-will is also featured in the last line of the chorus of the song "Deeper Than the Holler", a song written by Paul Overstreet and Don Schlitz, and recorded by American country music singer Randy Travis, where the singer's love is stated to be "longer than the song of a whippoorwill".

The second verse of the song, "My Home Among the Hills", about the state of West Virginia contains the lyrics "Where the moonlit meadows ring with the call of whippoorwills".

The chorus of HARDY's song, "Favorite Country Song", contains the lyrics "Whippoorwills singin' 'bout summertime".

The Tragically Hip's song, "Gus: The Polar Bear From Central Park", contains the lyrics "The whip-poor-will at dusk tells you no one is afraid".

Musician Jason Molina and his then-band Songs: Ohia released The Magnolia Electric Co. in 2003, which features a bonus track titled "Whip Poor Will".
