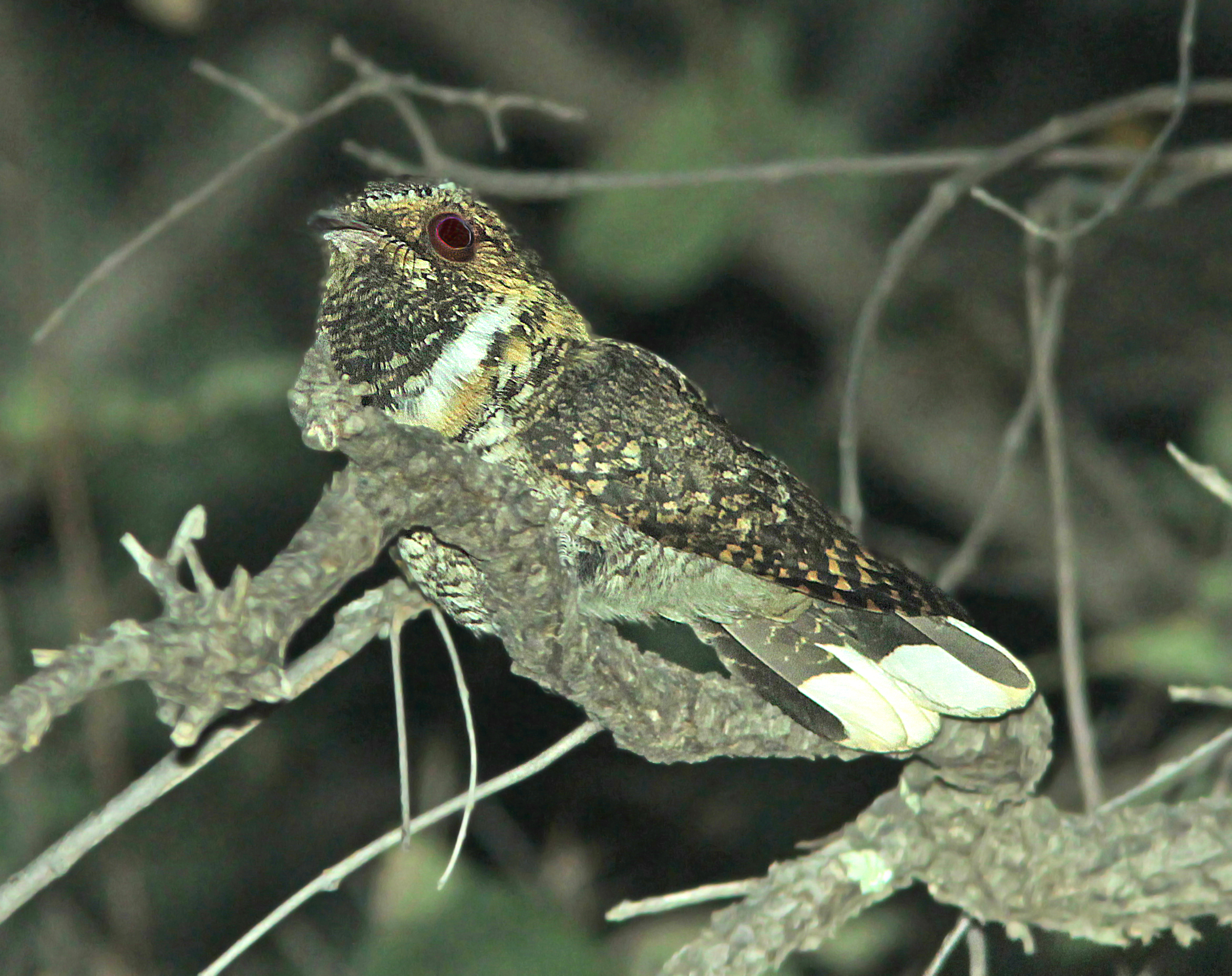

Conservation status
- Least Concern (IUCN 3.1)

Scientific classification
- Kingdom: Animalia
- Phylum: Chordata
- Class: Aves
- Clade: Strisores
- Order: Caprimulgiformes
- Family: Caprimulgidae
- Genus: Antrostomus
- Species: A. arizonae

Binomial name
- Antrostomus arizonae Brewster, 1881
- Breeding Year-round

Synonyms
- Caprimulgus arizonae

= Mexican whip-poor-will =

Species of bird

The Mexican whip-poor-will, (Antrostomus arizonae), is a medium-sized nightjar of the southwestern United States, Mexico, and northern Central America.

== Taxonomy and systematics ==
Until 2010 the Mexican whip-poor-will and what is now the eastern whip-poor-will (Antrostomus vociferus) were considered conspecific under the name whip-poor-will. They were separated based on differences in their genetics, morphology, and vocalizations. The two remain sister species and with the Puerto Rican nightjar (A. noctitherus) form a superspecies. The Mexican whip-poor-will has these five subspecies:

- A. a. arizonae Brewster (1881)
- A. a. setosus van Rossem (1934)
- A. a. oaxacae Nelson (1900)
- A. a. chiapensis Nelson (1900)
- A. a. vermiculatus Dickey & van Rossem (1928)

== Description ==
The Mexican whip-poor-will is 23 to 24 cm (9.1 to 9.4 in) long and weighs 45 to 50 g (1.6 to 1.8 oz). In general its upperparts are grayish brown with blackish brown streaks; the crown has wide blackish brown stripes. The throat and breast are blackish with a thin white band on the lower throat between them. The belly is buff with brown bars. The male's outermost three pairs of tail feathers have broad white tips; the female's are narrower and buffy. The wings are brown with tawny and buff spots and speckles. The subspecies differ somewhat. They are lighter in the north and darker in the south and there are variations in the tone of the body color (some are redder) and the size and shape of the spots and speckles.

== Distribution and habitat ==
The subspecies of the Mexican whip-poor-will are distributed thus:

- A. a. arizonae, breeds from southeastern California to southwestern Texas and south into the Mexican states of Jalisco and Guanajuato. The northernmost withdraw to the south in winter.
- A. a. setosus, resident in eastern Mexico from central Tamaulipas south to the Isthmus of Tehuantepec in northwestern Chiapas.
- A. a. oaxacae, resident in southwestern Mexico from Michoacán to the Isthmus of Tehuantepec.
- A. a. chiapensis, resident in eastern Oaxaca and northern Chiapas south to central Guatemala.
- A. a. vermiculatus, resident in Honduras and El Salvador.

A. a. arizonae inhabits several similar mid- to mid-upper elevation, semi-arid to moist, landscapes with the common features being oaks and pines. The habitat of the more southerly resident subspecies is poorly known but there too they are birds of forest and woodland.

== Behavior ==
The behavior of the Mexican whip-poor-will has not been extensively studied but is assumed to be essentially the same as that of eastern whip-poor-will. That species is crepuscular and nocturnal, and roosts motionless during the day.

=== Feeding ===
Mexican whip-poor-wills are assumed to forage like eastern whip-poor-wills by sallying from a tree perch and less frequently from the ground. The latter's prey is insects, with moths and beetles being the dominant types.

=== Breeding ===
The Mexican whip-poor-will lays its clutch of two eggs directly on leaf litter with no conventional nest. In Arizona they are laid in May and early June; laying dates are not known elsewhere. Both male and female have a brood patch, which probably means that both sexes tend the eggs as do eastern whip-poor-wills.

=== Vocalization ===
The Mexican whip-poor-will is more often heard than seen. Its song is an onomatopoeic whip-poor-will like that of its eastern congener, but lower in pitch and "less 'snappy' and slightly 'lazier'". It also makes a variety of other sounds including "a single, low, mellow quirt or queerp note", a growl, and a "growl-chuck".

== Status ==
The IUCN has assessed the Mexican whip-poor-will as being of Least Concern. It has a very large range and an estimated population of 320,000 mature individuals, though the latter is believed to be decreasing. No immediate threats have been identified.
