= OV =

Ov or OV may refer to:

== Places ==
- Ocean View, Virginia, a community in the city of Norfolk, Virginia
- Oost-Vlaanderen (East Flanders), a province in Flanders, Belgium
- Oro Valley, a town in Arizona, United States of America
- Overijssel, a province in the Netherlands

== People ==
- Alexander Ovechkin, NHL hockey player
- Orifice Vulgatron, a member of the rap group Foreign Beggars

== Brands ==
- Organic Valley, one of the world's largest organic food brands

== Organizations ==
- SalamAir, a low cost airline from Oman (IATA code OV)
- Orange Volunteers, a loyalist paramilitary group in Northern Ireland
- Orange Volunteers (1972), a loyalist vigilante group in Northern Ireland

== Arts and entertainment ==
- Original voice, the original voice of a motion picture
- OV (album), a 2005 album by Orthrelm
- OV, a 2021 album by The Kleptones
- OVGuide, a website aggregator

== Science and technology ==
- Orbiter Vehicle, a term for a NASA Space Shuttle
- Orbiting Vehicle, a series of satellites operated by the US Air Force
- OpenView, an HP network and systems management software product
- OV, a Japanese scale for basal body temperature.
- Organization validation, a type of public key certificate
- Official Veterinarian in the UK veterinary field
- Orthogonal Vectors, a problem in computational complexity theory and fine-grained complexity

== Linguistics ==
- A suffix found in surnames of Bulgarian and Russian men; see Russian names and Bulgarian names
- openbaar vervoer (Dutch for "public transport"), as in OV-chipkaart

== Other uses ==
- In the Bible, one of two forms of prohibited witchcraft; see Ov and Yidoni
- Old Vienna, a beer

== See also ==
- Orbital vehicle (disambiguation)
