= OW =

OW, O.W. or ow may refer to:

- Ow!, an interjection that denotes pain
- ow (digraph), an English digraph
- "Ow!" (composition), a Dizzy Gillespie bebop jazz composition
- Obwalden, a canton of Switzerland
- Organization Workshop, a method of adult education
- Executive Airlines (IATA code OW)
- Overwatch (2016 video game)
- Outer Wilds, a 2019 space exploration video game
- Old Westminster, an alumna or alumnus of Westminster School

== See also ==
- Ouch (disambiguation)
- OWW (disambiguation)
