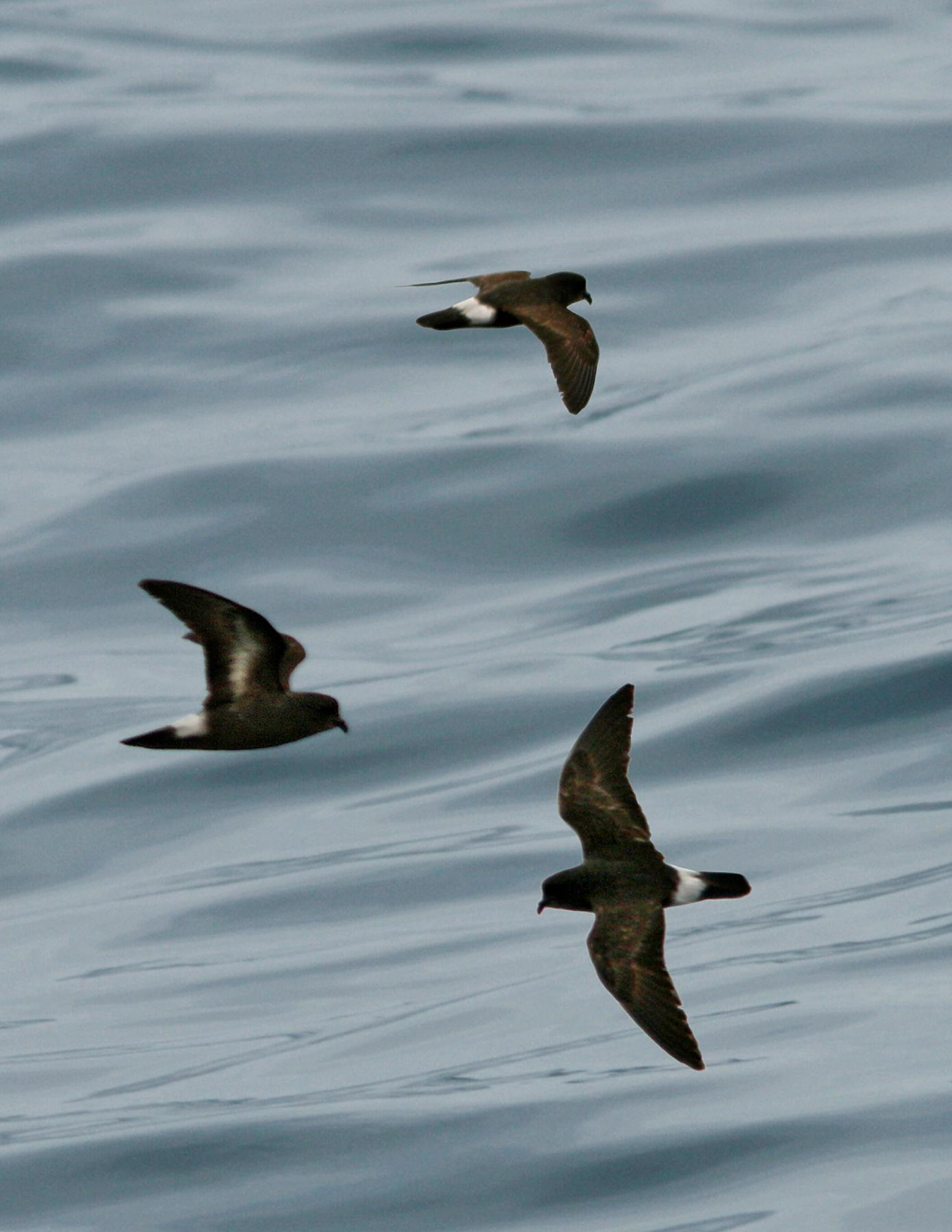
- European storm petrels (Hydrobatidae)
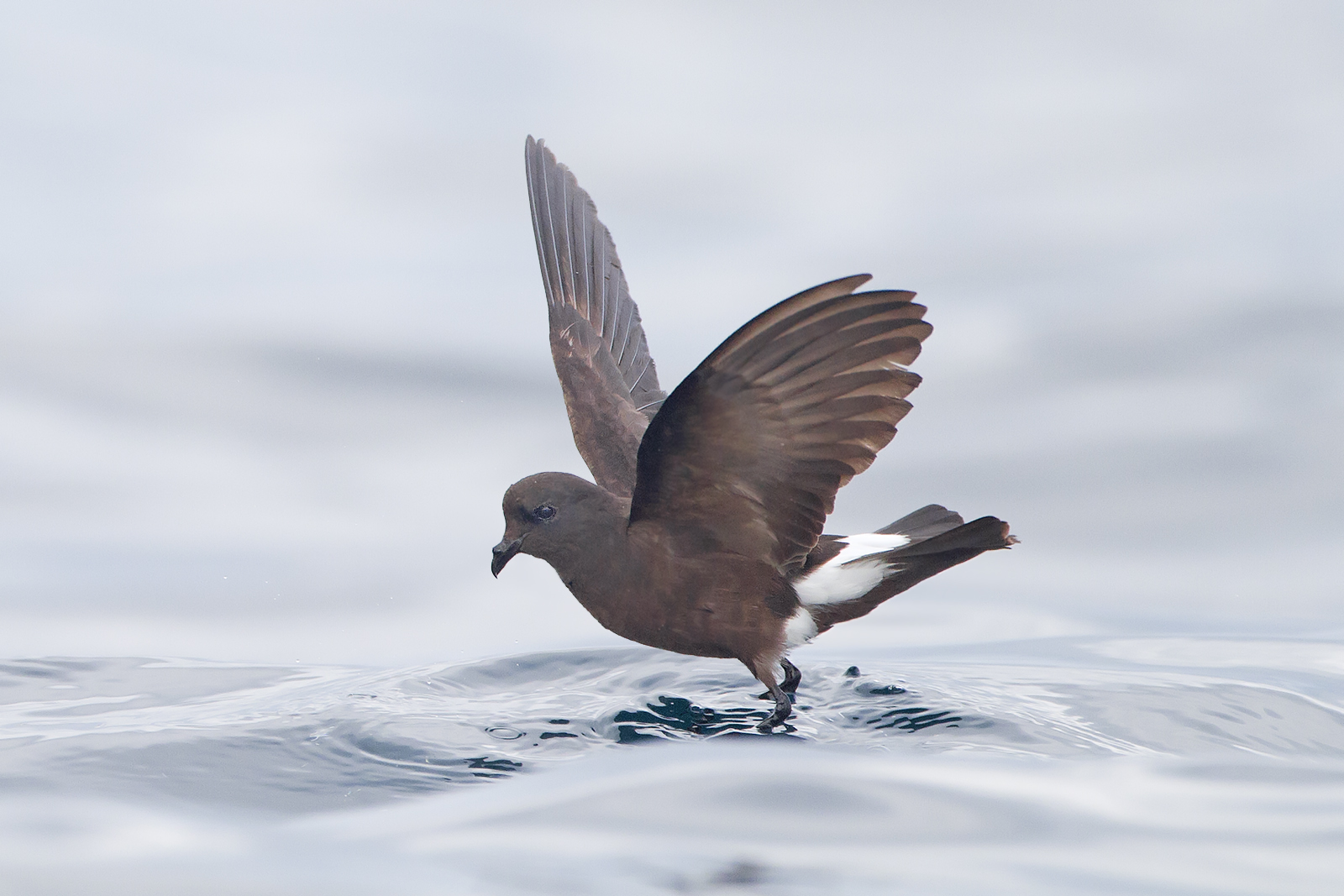
- Wilson's storm petrel (Oceanitidae)

Scientific classification
- Kingdom: Animalia
- Phylum: Chordata
- Class: Aves
- Clade: Austrodyptornithes
- Order: Procellariiformes

Groups included
- Hydrobatidae; Oceanitidae

Cladistically included but traditionally excluded taxa
- Diomedeidae; Procellariidae

= Storm petrel =

Storm petrel or stormy petrel may refer to one of two seabird families in the order Procellariiformes, which were historically treated as one family. Before the introduction of molecular phylogenetics, the traditional arrangement was to divide the Procellariiformes into a set of four families: Diomedeidae containing the albatrosses, Hydrobatidae containing all the storm petrels, Pelecanoididae containing the diving petrels and Procellariidae containing the petrels, shearwaters and fulmars. The family Hydrobatidae was further divided into two subfamilies, the northern storm petrels in Hydrobatinae and the southern or austral storm petrels in Oceanitinae.

A 1998 analysis of mitochondrial cytochrome b sequences found there was deep genetic divergence between the two subfamilies. Subsequent large-scale multigene studies found that the two subfamilies were not sister taxa. The storm petrels were therefore split into two families: Hydrobatidae containing the northern storm petrels and Oceanitidae, containing the southern storm petrels.

The species within the two families are:

- Northern storm petrels (Hydrobatidae) are found in the Northern Hemisphere, although some species around the Equator dip into the south.

Common name	Scientific name	Status
European storm petrel	Hydrobates pelagicus	LC
Fork-tailed storm petrel	Hydrobates furcatus	LC
Ringed storm petrel	Hydrobates hornbyi	NT
Leach's storm petrel	Hydrobates leucorhous	LC
Townsend's storm petrel	Hydrobates socorroensis	EN
Ainley's storm petrel	Hydrobates cheimomnestes	VU
Swinhoe's storm petrel	Hydrobates monorhis	NT
Ashy storm petrel	Hydrobates homochroa	EN
Band-rumped storm petrel	Hydrobates castro	LC
Monteiro's storm petrel	Hydrobates monteiroi	VU
Cape Verde storm petrel	Hydrobates jabejabe	LC
Wedge-rumped storm petrel	Hydrobates tethys	LC
Black storm petrel	Hydrobates melania	LC
Guadalupe storm petrel	Hydrobates macrodactylus	CR (Probably Extinct)
Markham's storm petrel	Hydrobates markhami	NT
Matsudaira's storm petrel	Hydrobates matsudairae	VU
Tristram's storm petrel	Hydrobates tristrami	LC
Least storm petrel	Hydrobates microsoma	LC

- Southern storm petrels (Oceanitidae) are found in all oceans, although only white-faced storm petrel (breeding in the North Atlantic, in addition to the Southern Ocean) and Wilson's storm petrels (on migration) are found in the Northern Hemisphere.

Common name	Scientific name	Status
Wilson's storm petrel	Oceanites oceanicus	LC
Pincoya storm petrel	Oceanites pincoyae	DD
Elliot's storm petrel	Oceanites gracilis	DD
Grey-backed storm petrel	Garrodia nereis	LC
White-faced storm petrel	Pelagodroma marina	LC
White-bellied storm petrel	Fregetta grallaria	LC
New Zealand storm petrel	Fregetta maoriana	CR
Black-bellied storm petrel or Gould's storm petrel	Fregetta tropica	LC
Polynesian storm petrel (including white-throated storm petrel)	Nesofregetta fuliginosa	EN

Up and down!—up and down!
From the base of the wave to the billow's crown,
And amidst the flashing and feathery foam
The stormy petrel finds a home,—
A home, if such a place may be
For her who lives on the wide, wide sea.

O’er the deep!—o'er the deep!
Where the whale and the shark and the sword-fish sleep,—
Outflying the blast and the driving rain,
The petrel telleth her tale—in vain!

— From "The Stormy Petrel", a poem by Barry Cornwall
