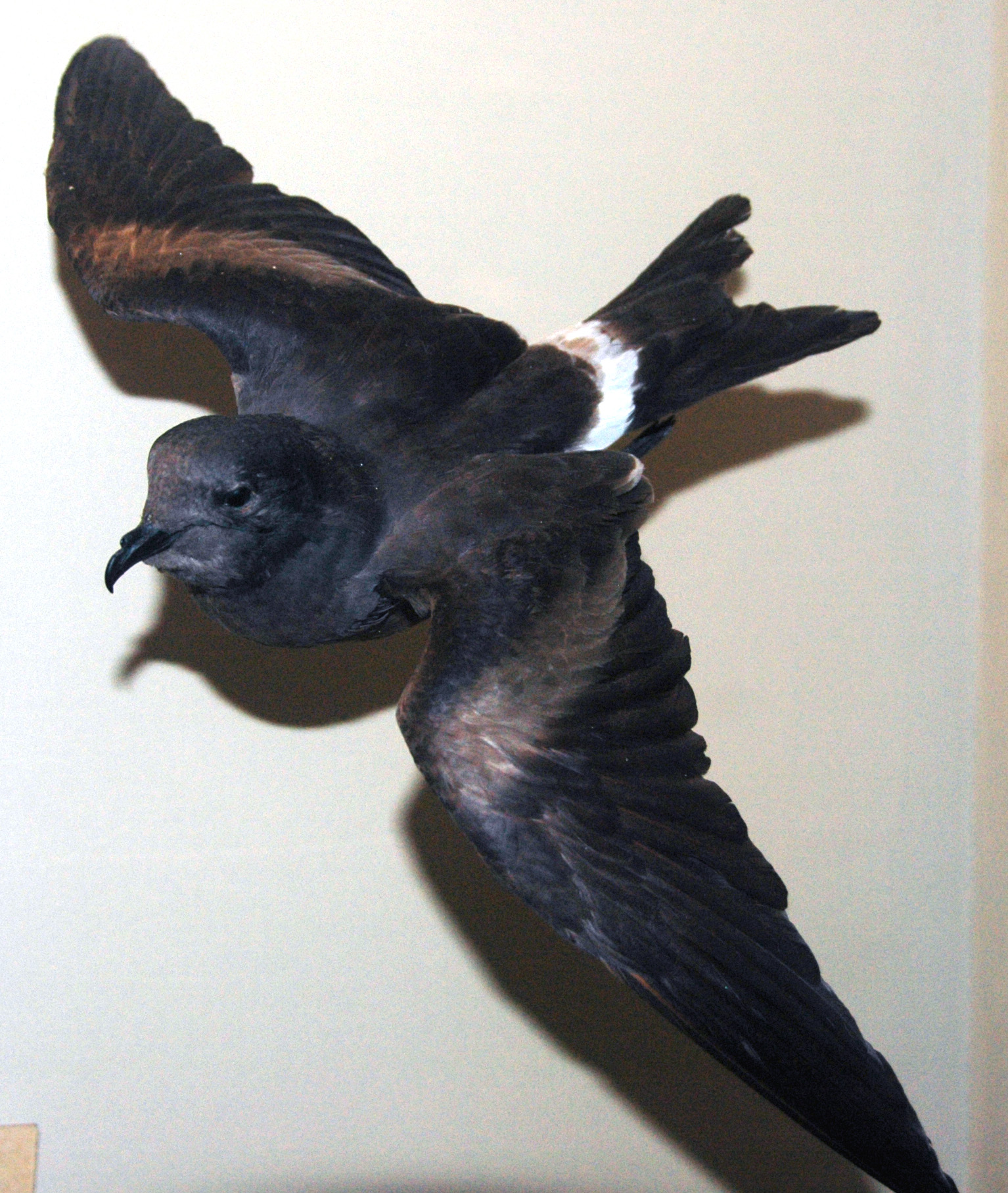
- Mounted specimen, Field Museum

Conservation status
- Critically endangered, possibly extinct (IUCN 3.1)

Scientific classification
- Kingdom: Animalia
- Phylum: Chordata
- Class: Aves
- Order: Procellariiformes
- Family: Hydrobatidae
- Genus: Hydrobates
- Species: H. macrodactylus

Binomial name
- Hydrobates macrodactylus (Bryant, WE, 1887)

Synonyms
- Oceanodroma leucorhoa macrodactyla W.E. Bryant, 1887 Oceanodroma macrodactyla W.E. Bryant, 1887

= Guadalupe storm petrel =

Species of bird

The Guadalupe storm petrel (Hydrobates macrodactylus) is a small seabird of the storm petrel family Hydrobatidae. It bred only on Guadalupe Island off Baja California, Mexico, and presumably ranged throughout the region. It has been assessed as Critically Endangered or possibly extinct.

== Taxonomy ==
It was formerly defined in the genus Oceanodroma before that genus was synonymized with Hydrobates.

== Description ==
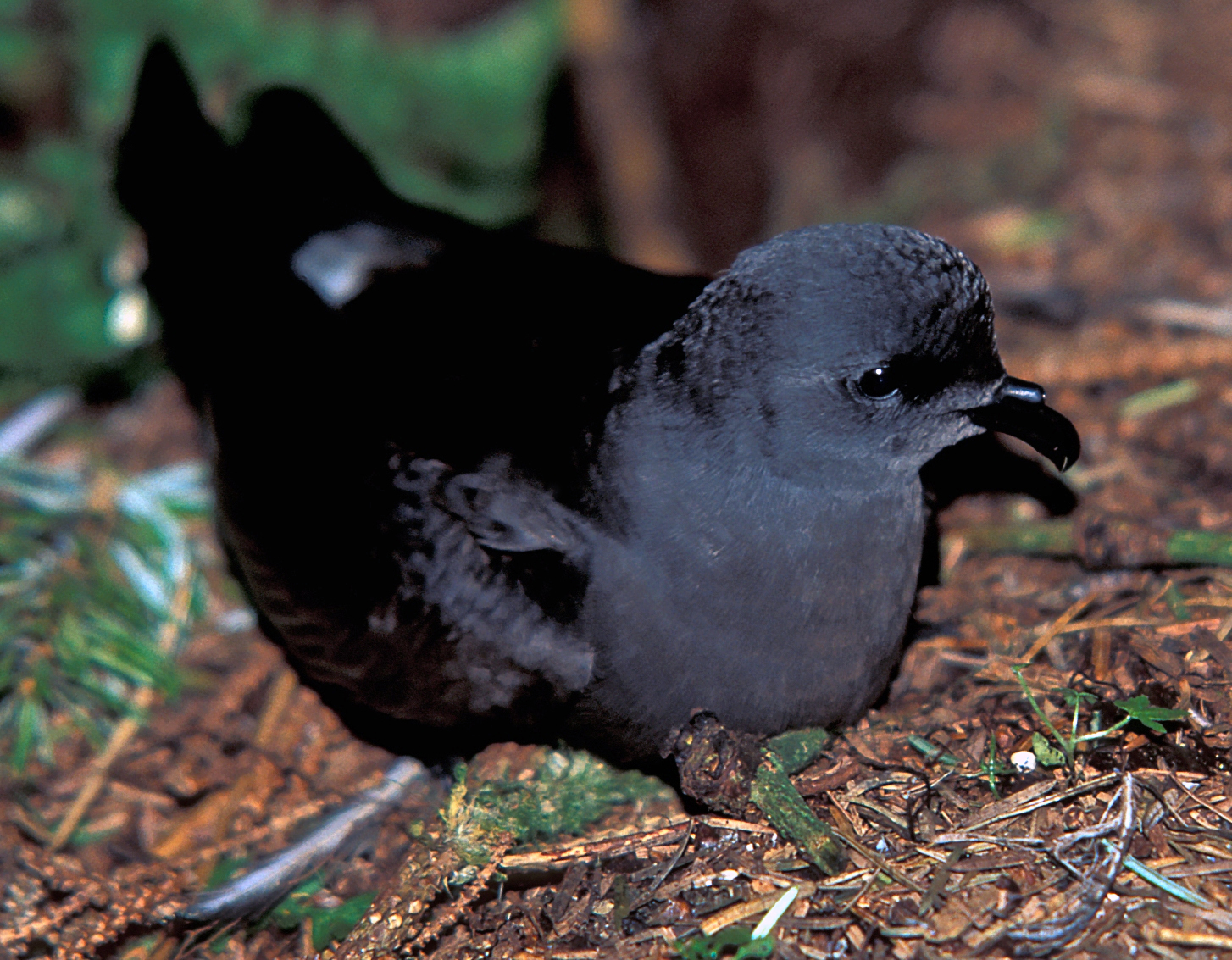
Sitting on its nest, the Guadalupe storm petrel would have looked exactly the same as the Leach's storm petrel in this photo

This species was almost indistinguishable from its relative, Leach's storm petrel. In the field, they could not be told apart except by their annual rhythm. In the hand, the Guadalupe storm petrel could be distinguished by slightly larger size and the paler underwing coverts. There is no evidence for sexual dimorphism in this species.

== Breeding ==
The breeding season was set between the two other breeding storm petrel species of Guadalupe, the winter-breeding Ainley's and the summer-breeding Townsend's, in accordance with Gause's law. The single egg, white with a faint ring of reddish-brown and lavender speckles around the blunt end, was laid in burrows maybe 15 in (35–40 cm) long, below the Guadalupe pine (Pinus radiata var. binata)-island oak (Quercus tomentella) (Note: Contrary to BirdLife International (2012), the birds were not associated with Guadalupe cypress woodland, which only occurs inland and at lower elevations.) cloud forest on top of Mount Augusta. By mid-June, almost all young had already left the burrows. Though little data is available on Hydrobates breeding, incubation was presumably 42 days or so in this species, just as in similar-sized relatives. Time to fledging must have taken between 60 and 75(−85?) days, most likely around 65 days. This would mean that egg-laying took place from early February to March, and that in April–May, unfledged young were present in most active burrows. Just as in their relatives, the egg was incubated a few days by either parent, after which the other took over, the relieved bird taking to the sea to feed itself for the next incubation stint. The young were fed only at night, also like in other storm petrels.

=== Call ===
Its call was described by Walter E. Bryant as sounding something like "here's a letter, here's a letter", with repeated interjections of "For you, for you".

== Ecology ==
Three species of lice were found to parasitize the Guadalupe storm petrel: the menoponids Longimenopon dominicanum and Austromenopon oceanodromae, and the ischnoceran Halipeurus raphanus. The second also occurs on some other storm petrels, and the third was also found on the ashy storm petrel. L. dominicanum, though, has to date not been found on other birds and seems to be a case of coextinction.

== Status ==
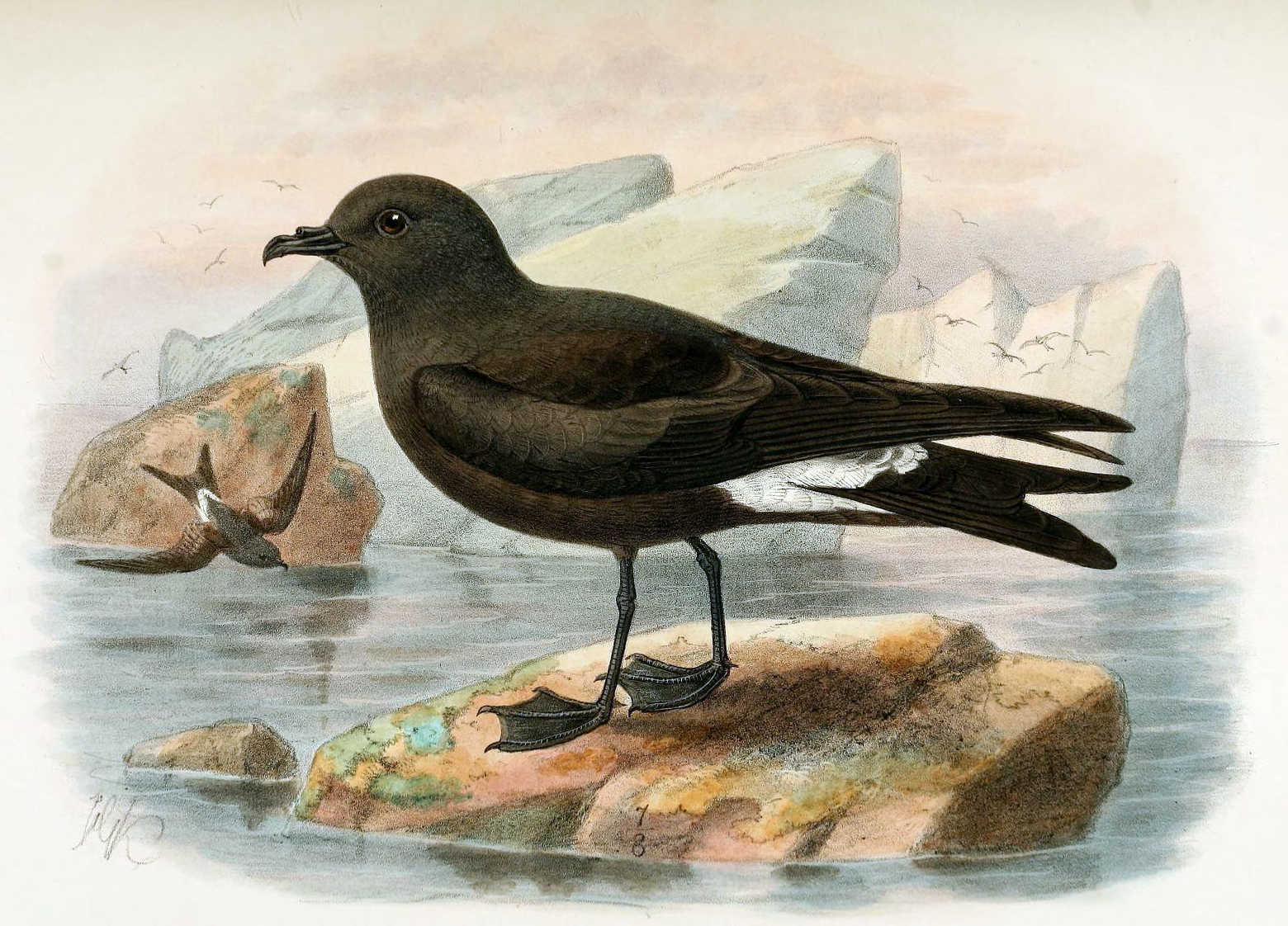
Illustration from 1907

In January 1885, multiple specimens were collected and described by Walter E. Bryant. The introduction of cats to the island decimated the population during the late 19th century. Introduced goats were also responsible for degradation of the environment. By the end of the 1906 breeding season, it was still considered "abundant", though the "large numbers" of birds present there and then must have been nearly the entire population of this species. Still, it was noted that:

the mortality among these birds from the depredations of the cats that overrun the island is appalling – wings and feathers lie scattered in every direction around the burrows along the top of the pine ridge.

Two storm petrels collected between March 2 and March 5, 1911, but were later identified in 1928 to be Townsend's storm petrels, and the last record of a breeding bird was in 1912. The species has not been seen since. Only old, abandoned burrows and the decayed remains of storm petrels killed by cats were found in the years thereafter. However, the Guadalupe storm petrel cannot be distinguished from the sympatric H. cheimomnestes/socorroensis in the field, and surveys on Guadalupe invariably took place outside the breeding season of H. macrodactyla, focusing on researching the local Leach's storm petrels. Thus, some hope remained for the present species' survival, or rather, its extinction could not be definitely confirmed.

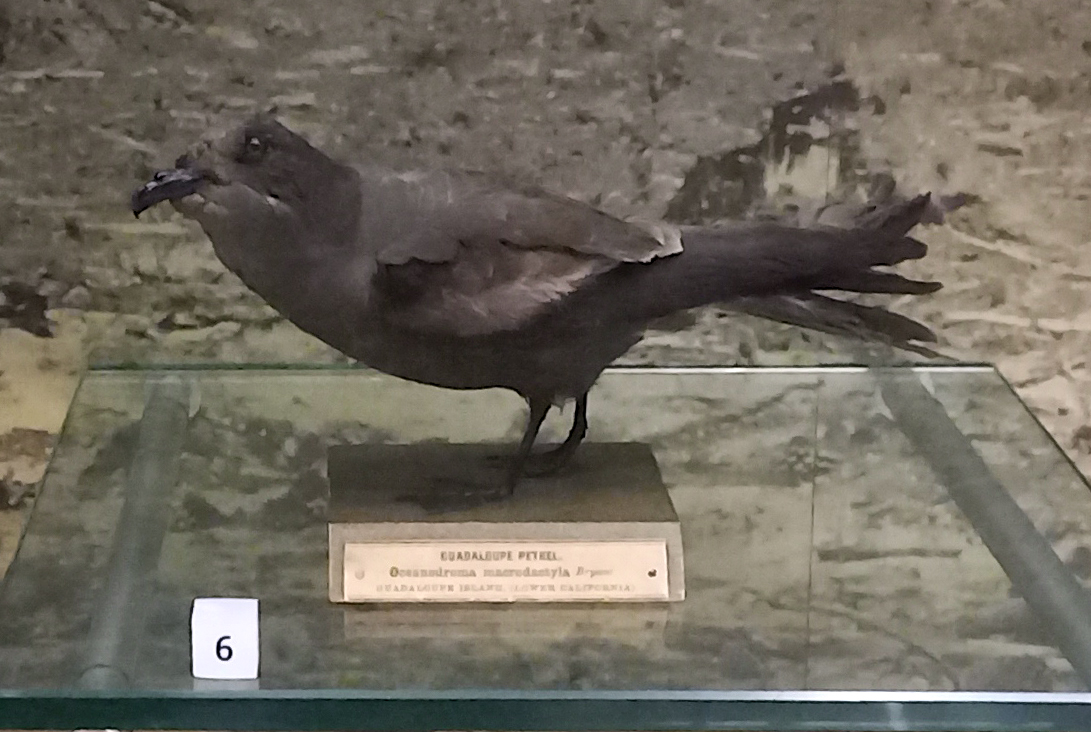
Specimen in National Museum of Scotland

From June 4 to June 10, 2000, the Guadalupe storm petrel's breeding grounds were finally surveyed at the correct time. Had the species survived, not only would recently fledged immature birds have been present, but also all signs of a recently ended breeding season, such as eggshells and freshly used burrows retaining the musky smell of these birds. In the words of the expedition's primary researcher, Exequiel Ezcurra of the San Diego Natural History Museum,

We searched thoroughly for the Guadalupe storm petrel, and failed to find it. Sadly, we are now more ready to admit that the species is indeed extinct. Never, since the 1920s, had so much search effort been devoted to this species. At different times, more than 10 researchers looked for the elusive creature. It simply was not there.

The official classification by the IUCN has not been updated yet. In any case, the precautionary principle would probably require a few years of follow-up surveys, possible now that restoration of Guadalupe's ecosystem is underway. Despite the species' likely extinction, the two other storm-petrel species that are also endemic breeders to Guadalupe - Townsend's and Ainley's storm petrels - still survive on offshore islets.

== See also ==
- Cryptic species complex
