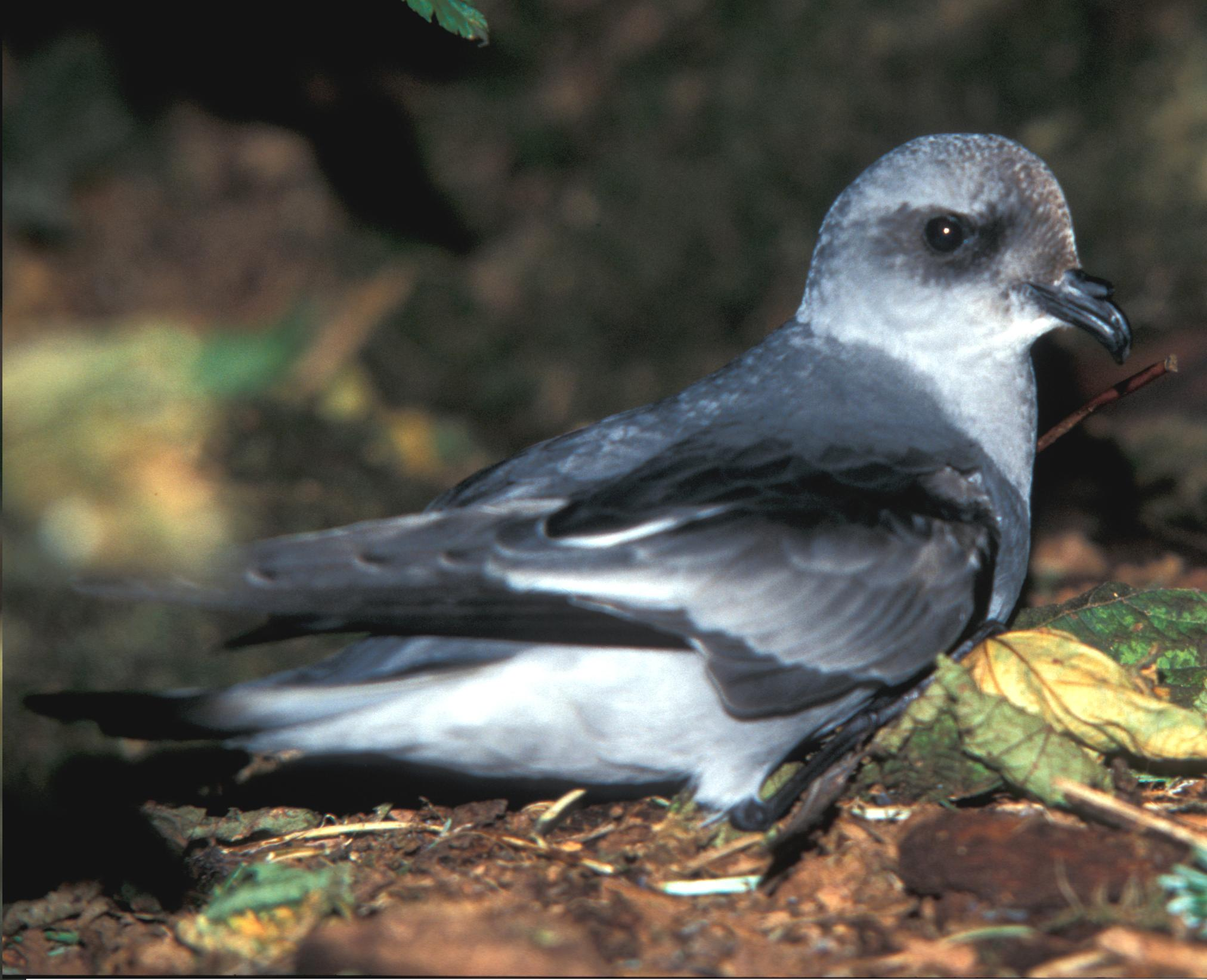

Conservation status
- Least Concern (IUCN 3.1)

Scientific classification
- Kingdom: Animalia
- Phylum: Chordata
- Class: Aves
- Order: Procellariiformes
- Family: Hydrobatidae
- Genus: Hydrobates
- Species: H. furcatus

Binomial name
- Hydrobates furcatus (Gmelin, JF, 1789)

= Fork-tailed storm petrel =

Species of bird

The fork-tailed storm petrel (Hydrobates furcatus) is a small seabird of the storm petrel family Hydrobatidae. It is the second-most abundant and widespread storm petrel (after Leach's storm petrel) and is the only bird in its family that is bluish-grey in colour.

The fork-tailed storm petrel is pelagic, spending up to 8 months in the northern Pacific Ocean. They only return to land to breed, where they nest in a single colony. Their nests can be found in a rock crevice or small burrow, where a single egg is laid. Their breeding range is along the coast of the northern Pacific Ocean, extending from northern California to northeast Asia.

They mainly feed on planktonic crustaceans, small fish, and squid, but also consume offal. Similarly to other storm petrels, they forage by picking food off the surface of the water while in flight.

== Taxonomy ==
The fork-tailed storm petrel was formally described in 1789 by the German naturalist Johann Friedrich Gmelin in his revised and expanded edition of Carl Linnaeus's Systema Naturae. He placed it with the petrels in the genus Procellaria and coined the binomial name Procellaria furcata. Gmelin based his description on the "fork-tailed petrel" that had been described in 1785 in separate publications by the English ornithologist John Latham and the Welsh naturalist Thomas Pennant. It is now one of 18 species placed in the genus Hydrobates that was erected in 1822 by the German zoologist Friedrich Boie. The genus name combines the Ancient Greek hudro- meaning "water-" with batēs meaning "walker". The specific epithet furcatus is Latin meaning "forked".

Two subspecies are recognized:

- H. f. furcatus (Gmelin, JF, 1789) – northern population, breeds in northeast Asia to Alaska
- H. f. plumbeus (Peale, 1849) – southern population, breeds in southeast Alaska south to northern California

The major differences between the two subspecies are slight size and plumage differences, where southern populations appear somewhat smaller and darker. Southern populations also begin and end their breeding season earlier than their northern counterparts. However, no molecular genetic analysis has been conducted to discern the two subspecies.

The species was formerly assigned to the genus Oceanodroma before that genus was synonymized with Hydrobates.

== Description ==
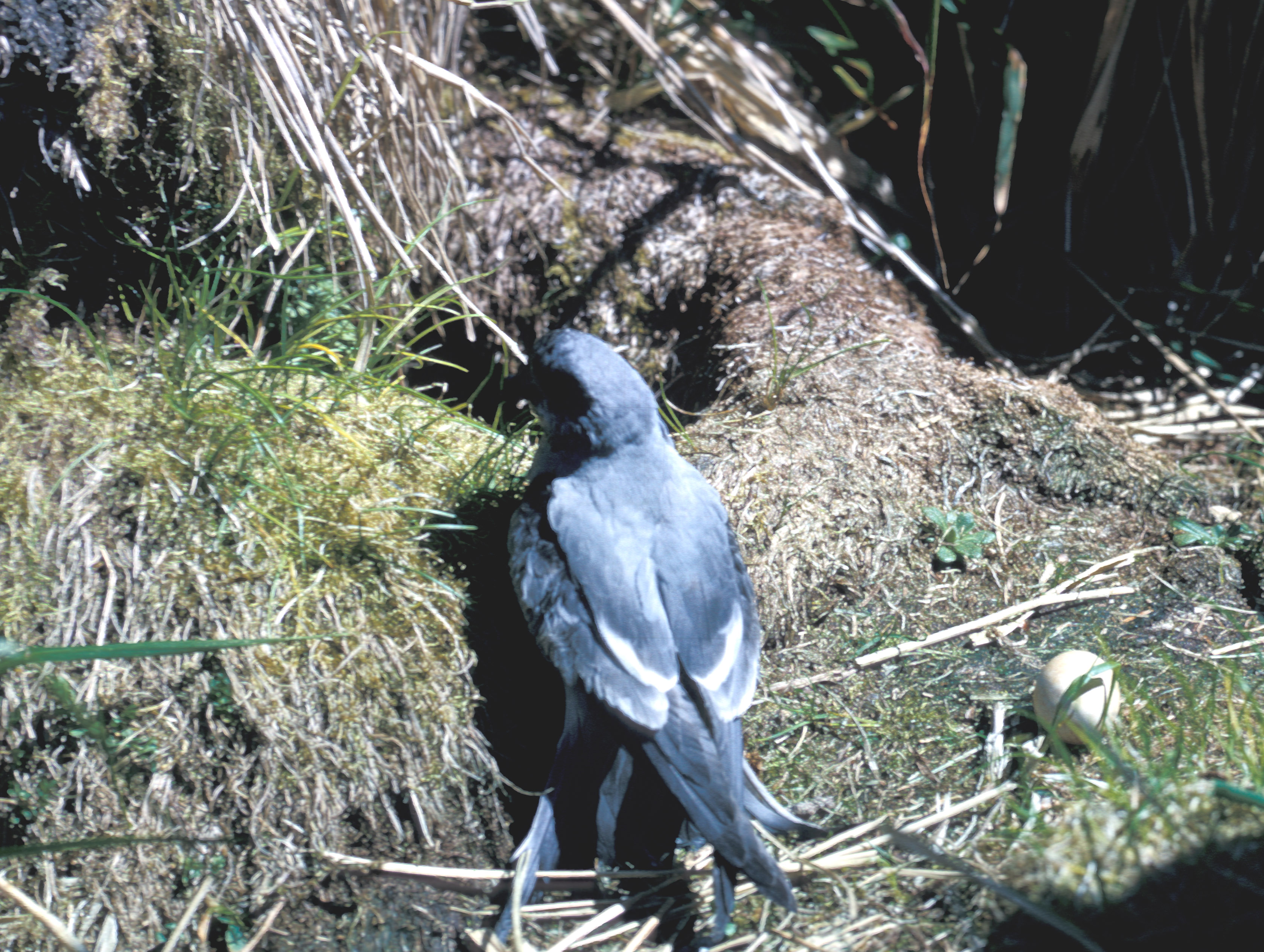
The forked tail is more easily seen from above.

The fork-tailed storm petrel is small seabird that is 20 cm in length with a wingspan of 46 cm. Its foraging behaviour resembles other storm petrels, where it flies with short, stiff wingbeats close to the surface of the water.

Despite its name, the forked tail in this bird is not always visible. The distinguishing feature of fork-tailed storm petrels is their overall bluish-gray plumage. They generally have a paler underside, which contrasts the darker colours under their wings. They also have a dark gray forehead, a black ear patch, and a small, black bill. Other storm petrels are significantly darker, such as the similar looking ashy storm petrel. However, fork-tailed storm petrels from southern populations are somewhat darker than those in the north.

Males and females are generally very similar in colour and size. Juveniles also resemble adults with the exception of having a less noticeable notch in their tails.

They are generally silent and only call when entering their breeding colony at night. Their most common call is a 3- to 5-note, raspy "ana-ana-ana", heard from both sexes. This is especially intense during courtship, where their calls are accompanied by elaborate aerial displays. A higher-pitched, single note call is typically emitted by males, and it is used to locate females in noisy colonies and to maintain the pair bond.

== Distribution and habitat ==
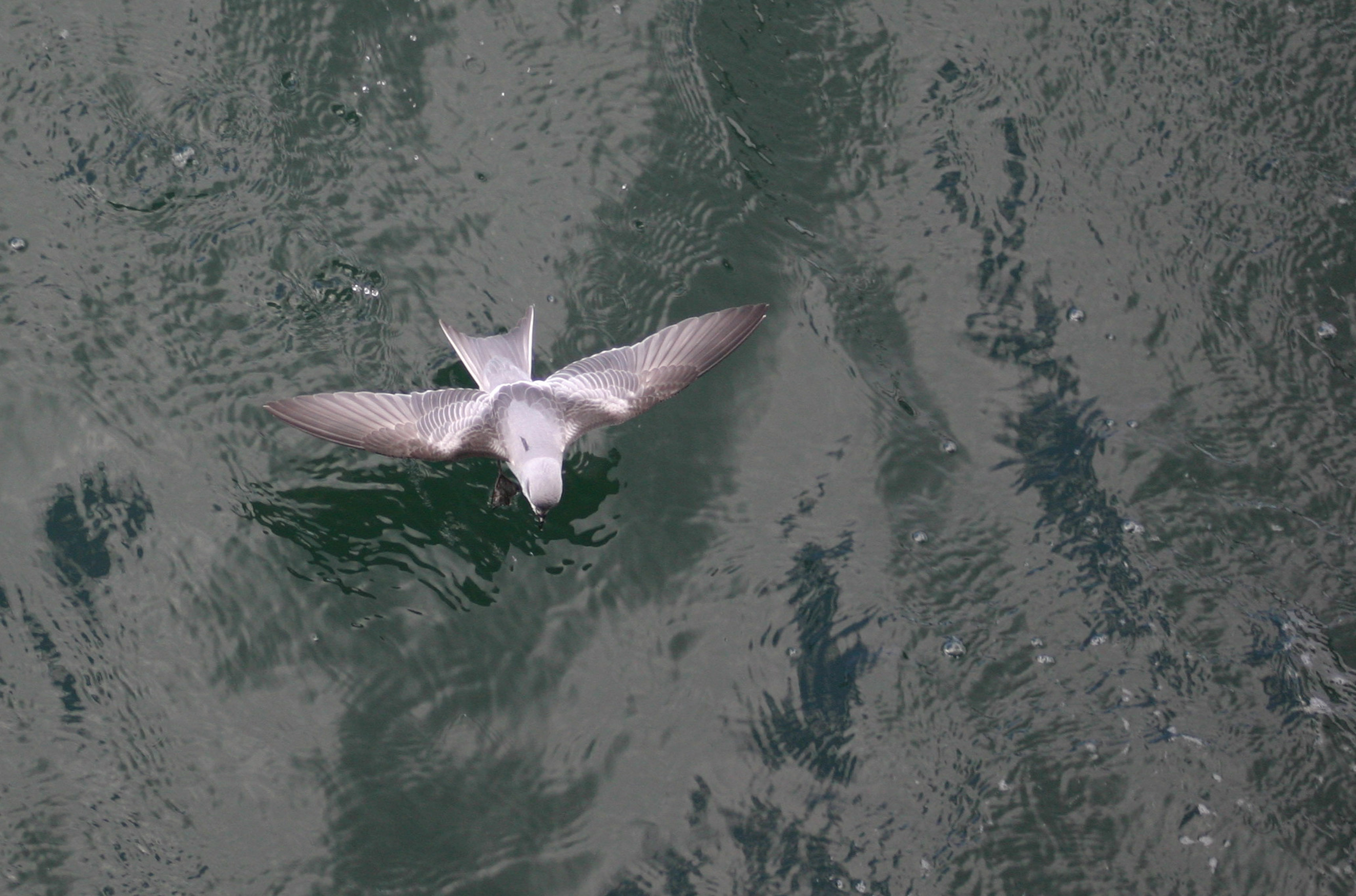
The fork-tailed storm petrel frequents the open ocean and only returns to land to breed.

The range of the fork-tailed storm petrel is estimated to cover 22,400,000 km^{2} with over 6,000,000 individuals occurring globally, making it the second-most widespread and abundant storm petrel. During the breeding season, the fork-tailed storm petrel form dense colonies on islands throughout northern California, Oregon, Washington, British Columbia, Alaska, and northeast Asia off the Kamchatka Peninsula. Most of their population is concentrated in Alaska, notably in the Bering Sea near the Aleutian Islands. Their southernmost colony is on Little River Rock in Humboldt County, with a population of 200 individuals. It was reported in July 1939 that fork-tailed storm petrels were breeding on the Flannan Isles, Na h-Eileanan Flannach, which are about 35 km west of the northern tip of the Outer Hebrides, Scotland.

Their nesting habitat varies, ranging from bare rock to forests. They typically build their nests under rock crevices or roots, or burrow into soft ground with low-growing vegetation.

As they frequent the open ocean, little is known about fork-tailed storm petrels outside of the breeding season. They have been frequently sighted off the Californian coast, making them the most northerly distributed storm petrel during the winter. Sparse sightings also indicate that they forage as far south as Hawaii.

== Behaviour ==
=== Food and feeding ===
Like other storm petrels, the fork-tailed storm petrel mainly feeds on crustaceans and fish near the surface of the ocean, including amphipods, myctophids, shallow-water fish (such as greenling and sablefish), copepods, decapods, and squid. They are also extremely opportunistic and can be seen scavenging on fatty tissue of dead marine mammals and also trailing behind fishing boats.

Fork-tailed storm petrels have a well-developed olfactory system and heavily rely on odour to scout for food, so often they are the first birds to arrive at a pungent food source. When at the source, these birds seize their prey by fluttering across the water surface and may occasionally dive to depths of 0.6 m.

Like other Procellariiformes, the fork-tailed storm petrel produces stomach oil from its digested food and stores it in its proventriculus, a section of the bird's digestive system. This oil permits these birds to go for a long time without food, but also allows them to transport nutrient-rich food back to their chicks from distant sources.

=== Breeding ===
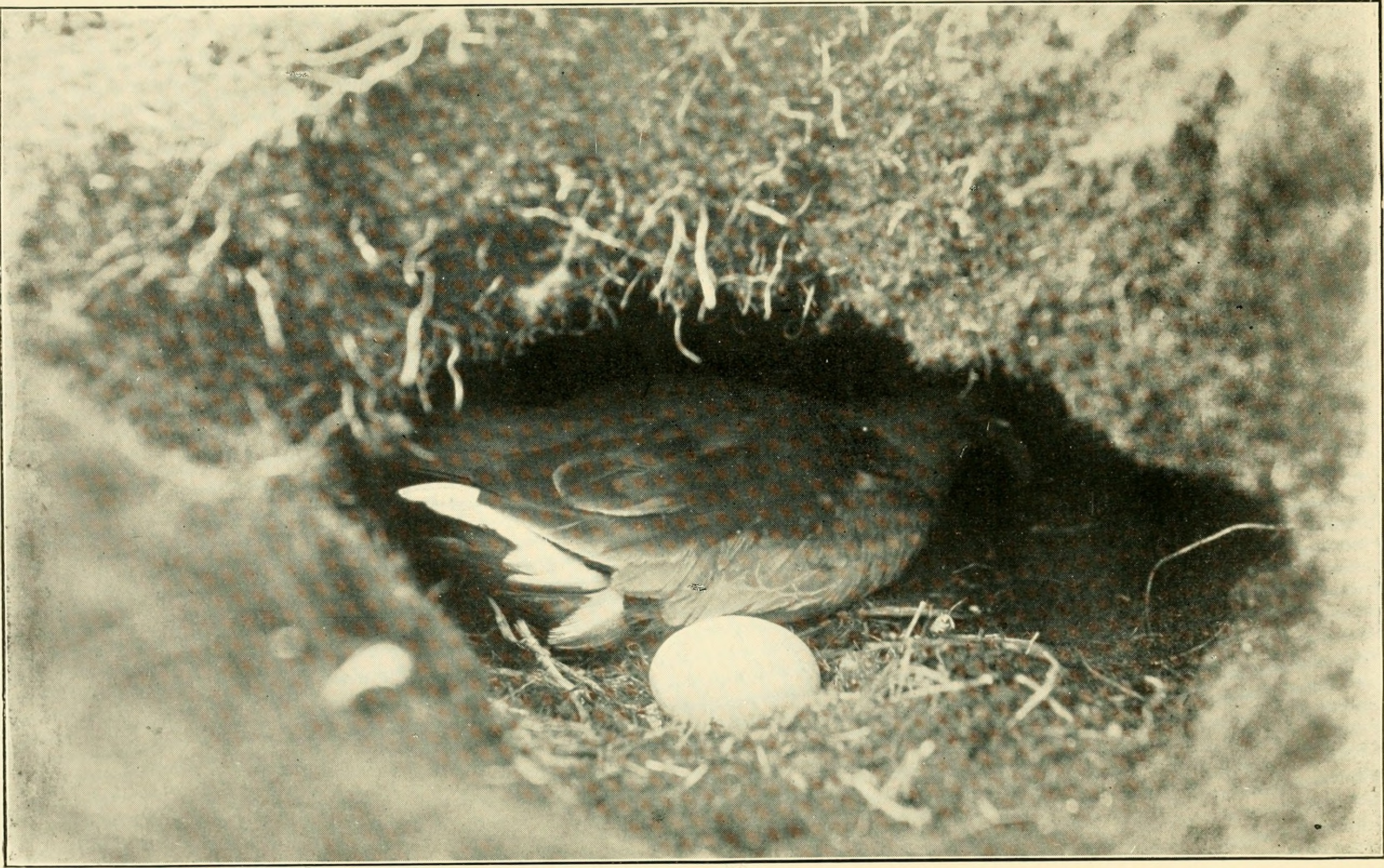
The fork-tailed storm petrel incubates a single egg in its burrow.

Like other species, fork-tailed storm petrels spend most of their time out at sea and only return to land to breed around late March to early April. To avoid predation and harassment by gulls, these birds only enter the colony at night and depart before sunrise.

The fork-tailed storm petrel builds its nest in rock crevices or small burrows on isolated islands. Courtship consists of vocalizations and aerial displays, often lasting for several weeks. Once established, pairs will remain together for the rest of the breeding season and if they are successful, continually use the same nest year after year. Females will lay a single white egg directly on the floor of the burrow, and both parents will incubate it for around 50 days. Once the egg hatches, the adult keeps the chick warm using its brood patch for the first five days. Once able to thermoregulate for itself, the parents then leave the chick, only returning to feed it one every one to four nights. After two months of slow growth, the petrel chick will finally fledge and leave the burrow.

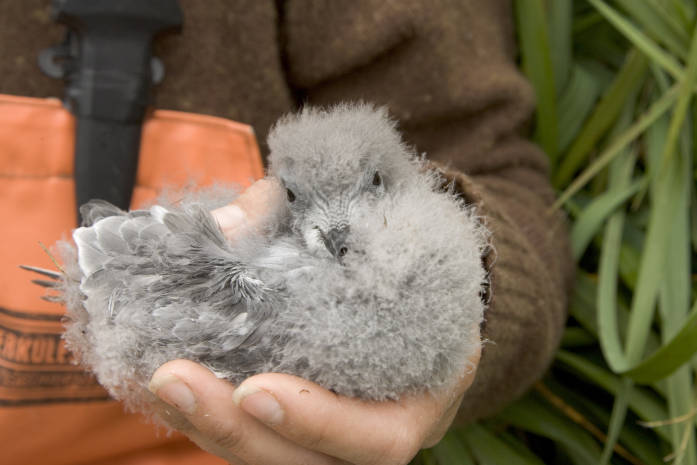
A fork-tailed storm petrel chick

Living in areas with severe climatic conditions, fork-tailed storm petrels have many adaptations to ensure breeding success. Eggs can be left unattended up to 7 days and still successfully hatch, whereas chick growth rates can be adjusted to being faster or slower depending on food supply, rather at a constant rate like many other birds.

=== Interspecific interactions ===
The fork-tailed storm petrel is often the sole prey item for predators early in the breeding season because they return to these remote islands long before any other seabirds. These birds comprise a significant part of the diet of river otters, gulls, and raptors. Further, introduced predators such as foxes, martens, and raccoons have a significant impact on breeding populations. To defend themselves, fork-tailed storm petrels can eject their stomach oil at an incoming threat.

Fork-tailed storm petrels generally coexist peacefully with other seabirds, where they can be seen sharing breeding habitat with tufted puffins. In some cases, aggression can be observed, where they are known to steal food from Leach's storm petrels.

== Human impacts and conservation ==
Being widespread and abundant, the fork-tailed storm petrel is not threatened with extinction. However, humans impact their life history in many ways.

As a species that feeds on surface material and follows ships, this storm petrel often ingests oil and plastic with their food items. Surprisingly, the fork-tailed storm petrel is relatively unaffected by the toxicity of oil, as their natural diet contains substances that are very chemically similar. Plastics also do not severely affect the birds because they can be regurgitated after ingestion.

In contrast, being a top marine predator, fork-tailed storm petrels are susceptible to bioaccumulation. High lead concentrations have been found in the bones of petrels, and DDT can cause eggshells to become dangerously thin.

The greatest threats that face fork-tailed storm petrels today are global climate change and introduced species. An increased severity of storms makes foraging more dangerous, decreasing the chances that an adult will return to the colony. The introduction of mammals also adversely affect storm petrels, where raccoons and river otters prey upon nests, and rabbits increase soil erosion and compromise the structural integrity of burrows.
