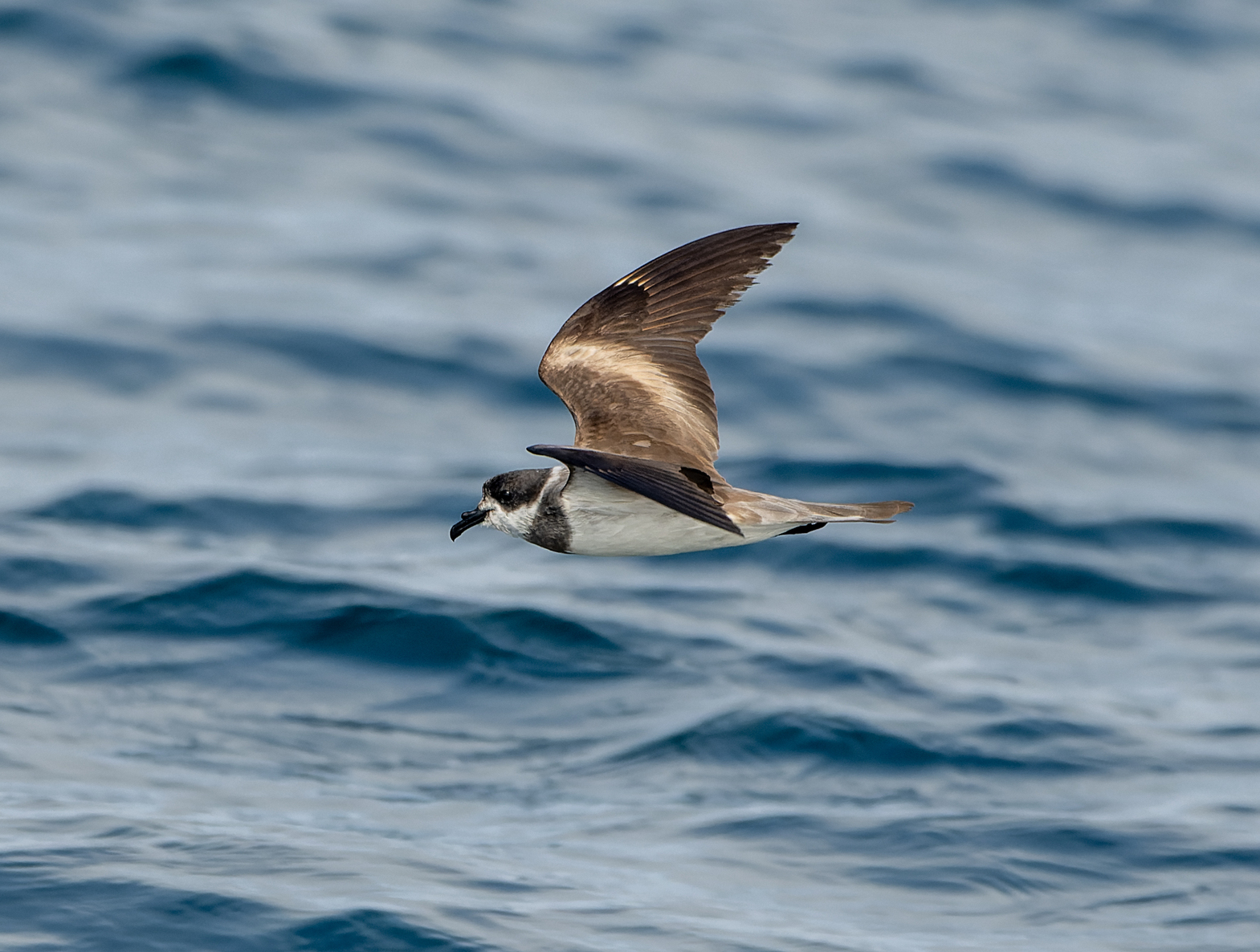

Conservation status
- Near Threatened (IUCN 3.1)

Scientific classification
- Kingdom: Animalia
- Phylum: Chordata
- Class: Aves
- Order: Procellariiformes
- Family: Hydrobatidae
- Genus: Hydrobates
- Species: H. hornbyi

Binomial name
- Hydrobates hornbyi (Gray, GR, 1854)
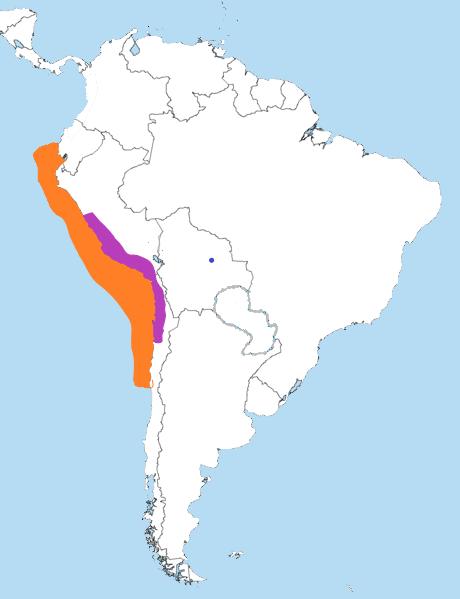

Synonyms
- Oceanodroma hornbyi

= Ringed storm petrel =

Species of bird

The ringed storm petrel (Hydrobates hornbyi), also known as Hornby's storm petrel, is a seabird that ranges in the Humboldt Current off the coasts of South America. The species is a very distinctive member of the storm petrel family, with a dark cap, white face and underparts, forked tail and a black band across the chest. It is relatively common in the seas off Peru, Chile and Ecuador. The species is named after Admiral Sir Phipps Hornby.

== Taxonomy ==
The ringed storm petrel was formally described in 1854 by the English zoologist George Gray and given the binomial name Thalassidroma hornbyi. He chose the specific epithet to honour Admiral Sir Phipps Hornby who had obtained the specimen. The ringed storm petrel was formerly placed in the genus Oceanodroma but is now placed in the genus Hydrobates, the only genus in the Northern storm petrel family Hydrobatidae.

== Breeding ==
Little is known about the breeding biology of the ringed storm petrel. The first colony of this seabird ever found was discovered in April 2017 by Chilean ornithologists from the Red de Observadores de Aves y Vida Silvestre de Chile (ROC). Breeding burrows of this seabirds were discovered in the Atacama Desert (northern Chile), over 70 km away from the sea, near the city of Diego de Almagro, not the habitat where one would expect to find this seabird. More breeding sites are expected to be found in Chile and Peru: every year fledglings are found stranded on the city streets of Peru, distracted by the city lights.

The birds are thought to breed between March and July, as this is when fledglings are regularly seen at sea around Lima, Peru, and Antofagasta, Chile. There have also been reports of mummified fledglings and adults found in crevices in the Atacama Desert 50 km from the sea, and even reports of one fledgling being seen 150 km from the sea, and one unproven report of a bird flying into a nest in the town of Caraz in Peru, 100 km from the sea. The breed's first documented nest was found by a group of volunteer naturalists in the Atacama Desert in April 2017.

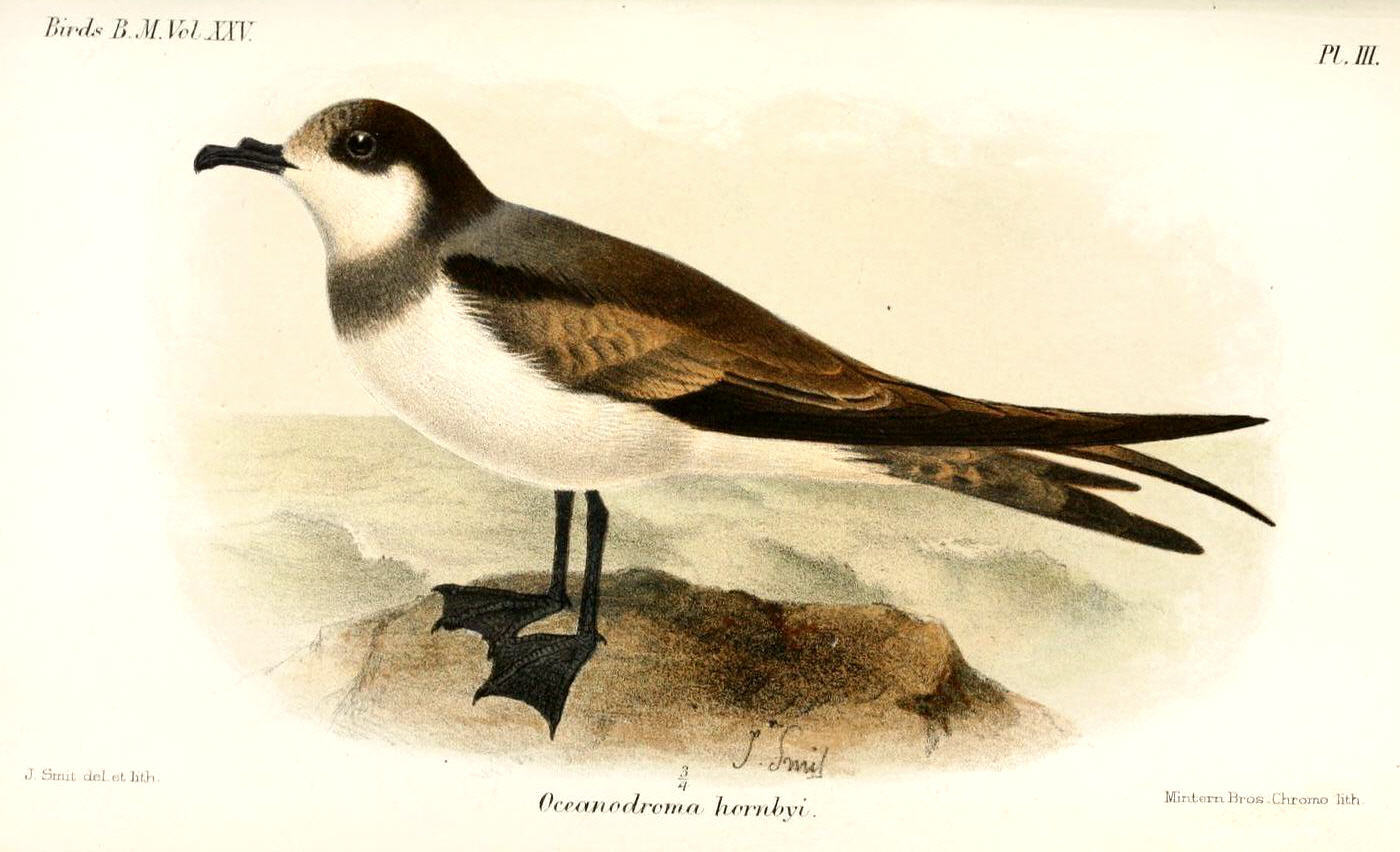
Illustration by Joseph Smit, 1896

== Status and conservation ==
It is difficult to know how threatened, if at all, the ringed storm petrel is. At sea, estimates put the population in the thousands or tens of thousands. Recently a vagrant ringed storm petrel was seen off the coast of California by a team from the NOAA.

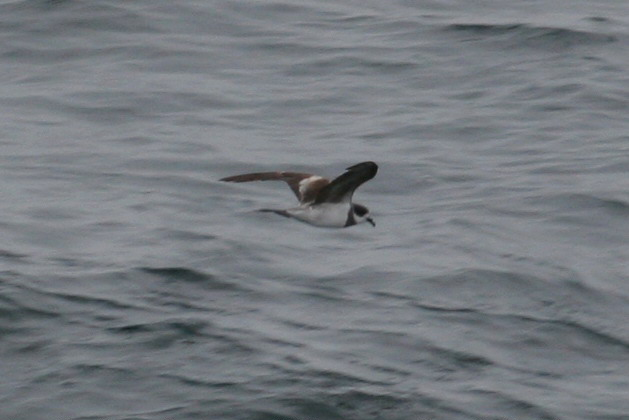
At sea, showing the distinctive black band and cap
