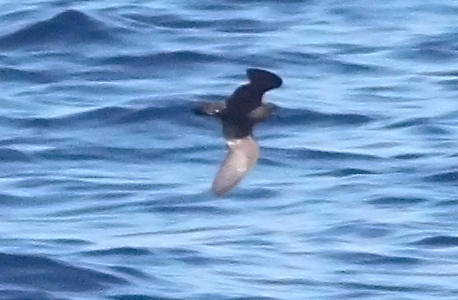

Conservation status
- Least Concern (IUCN 3.1)

Scientific classification
- Kingdom: Animalia
- Phylum: Chordata
- Class: Aves
- Order: Procellariiformes
- Family: Hydrobatidae
- Genus: Hydrobates
- Species: H. microsoma

Binomial name
- Hydrobates microsoma (Coues, 1864)

Synonyms
- Oceanodroma microsoma

= Least storm petrel =

Species of bird

The least storm petrel (Hydrobates microsoma) is a small seabird of the storm petrel family Hydrobatidae. It is 13–15 cm in length, with a wingspan of 32 cm. It is the smallest member of the order Procellariiformes. It was formerly defined in the genus Oceanodroma before that genus was synonymized with Hydrobates.

It breeds on islands off the Baja Peninsula and Gulf of California of Mexico in rock crevices or small burrows in soft earth and lays a single white egg.The single egg that this bird lays is white with a wreath of fine black specks around one and sometimes both ends. Like most petrels, its walking ability is limited to a short shuffle to the burrow. It is a colonial nester.

It spends the rest of the year at sea, reaching as far south as the tropical Pacific South America. It frequently can be seen well offshore of southern California in late summer and autumn.

It feeds on mainly planktonic crustaceans, with a preference of larvae of spiny lobsters. It feeds similarly to other storm petrels, picking food off the surface of the water while in flight.

The least storm petrel suffers losses on some of the breeding islands, particularly from feral cats and rats.
