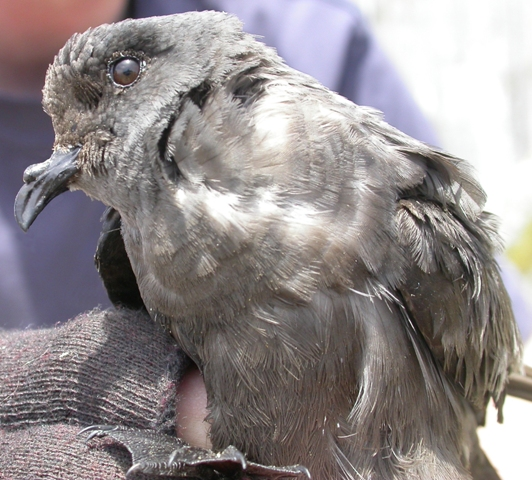

Conservation status
- Endangered (IUCN 3.1)

Scientific classification
- Kingdom: Animalia
- Phylum: Chordata
- Class: Aves
- Order: Procellariiformes
- Family: Hydrobatidae
- Genus: Hydrobates
- Species: H. homochroa

Binomial name
- Hydrobates homochroa (Coues, 1864)

Synonyms
- Oceanodroma homochroa Coues, 1864

= Ashy storm petrel =

Species of bird

The ashy storm petrel (Hydrobates homochroa) is a small, scarce seabird of the storm petrel family Hydrobatidae. It breeds colonially on islands off the coasts of California and Mexico, and is one of six species of storm petrel that live and feed in the rich California Current system.

== Taxonomy ==
The ashy storm petrel was first described by American ornithologist Elliott Coues in 1864. Both its common and scientific name, homochroa, "uniformly colored", from Ancient Greek (h)omoia (όμοια), "alike" + "chroma" (χρώμα) "color", come from its coloration.

It was formerly defined in the genus Oceanodroma before that genus was synonymized with Hydrobates.

== Description and ecology ==
This is a small, uniformly sooty-brown storm petrel with a forked tail, closely resembling the black storm petrel, but it is smaller and has a more fluttering style of flight, with the upstroke only becoming horizontal to the body before beginning the downstroke (other storm petrels in its range have a higher upstroke).

It is a gregarious bird at sea, feeding nocturnally on cephalopods, fish (particularly the deep-sea myctophids, which rise to the sea's surface at night) and euphausiid krill such as Thysanoessa spinifera, which also swarm at the surface. They also attend fishing vessels for the fish oils released when the nets are pulled.

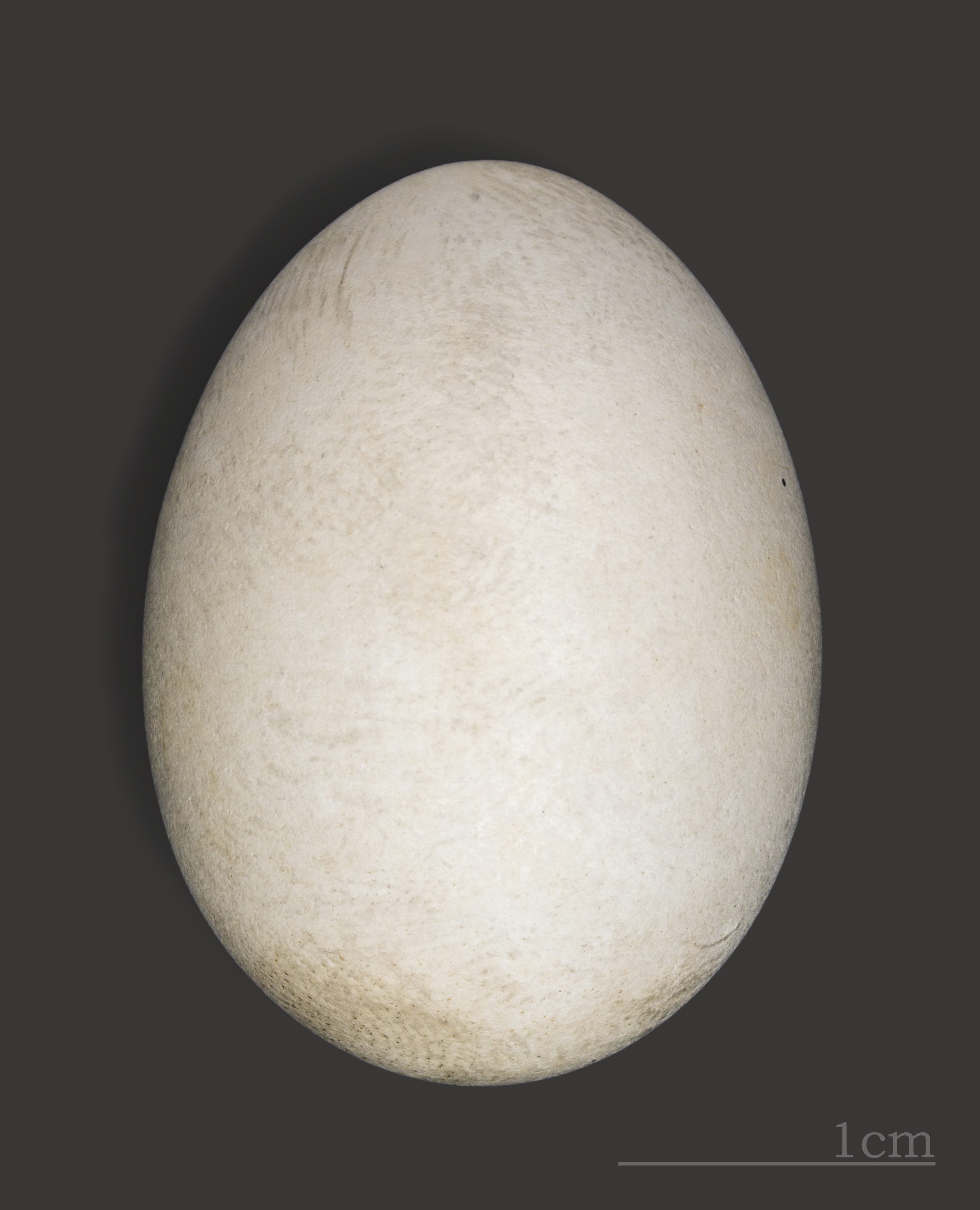
Egg (coll.MHNT)

Ashy storm petrels nest in rock burrows on offshore islands, returning to the nests at night. The species has a long breeding cycle, laying eggs in May and fledging in October, although timing varies greatly, more so than in most other storm petrels; some pairs may have a chick that is half grown when other pairs are still laying. Like in many other seabirds, pairs show both mate and site fidelity, mating in the same pair with the same mate for many years and nesting at the same burrow, despite the pairs spending their lives out of the breeding season separate from each other, and despite the fact that many individuals might seem to compete for burrows at the nesting colonies. A change in mate is usually associated with a change in nesting site.

The ashy storm petrel is a long-lived bird; a banded individual has lived at least 31 years.

== Distribution, status, and threats ==
Ashy storm petrels breed on 17 islands in the northeast Pacific, principally off the coast of California, but including a few sites off the coast of northwestern Mexico. Half the world's population nests on the Farallon Islands near San Francisco. Other breeding islands include the eight Channel Islands of California and a small population on Mexico's Coronados. Bat Cave, on the north side of Santa Cruz Island in Southern California, has the largest nesting colony for the ashy storm petrel in the world, with over 100 nests. Outside of the breeding season, it is believed to be more widely distributed, foraging on the California Current, but it undertakes no large migration and does not range as far as other species of storm petrels. In the early fall, large flocks can be seen in Monterey Bay. The birds do not range inland any significant distance except when storm-blown; for example, a sighting in San Mateo County, California was considered "unusual" by an experienced naturalist.

The world population is estimated to be around 10,000 birds, 8,000 of them breeders, with the Farallon population having declined by one-third between 1972 and 1992. The ashy storm petrel is designated as a species of conservation concern in California. It is threatened by western gull and burrowing owl predation, illumination from fishing boats, introduced predators such as rats and feral cats, and pollution. Most of the islands where it breeds are covered by some degree of protection.

Global warming could have a profound impact on ashy storm petrels. Future changes to coastal California waters due to global warming could result in warmer, less productive waters, which would mean less food would be available for the petrels. In addition, ocean acidification may result in a decline of crustacean prey species due to the effects that excess CO_{2} will have on the animals' shells. Sea-level rise will also threaten certain nesting sites that would be located too close to water.
