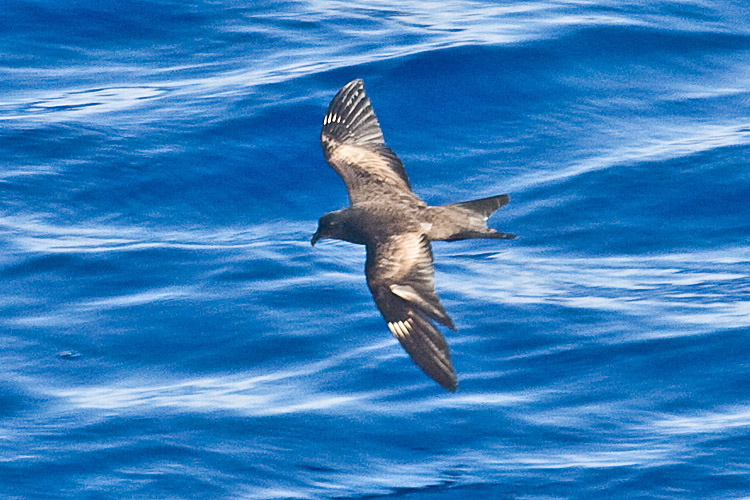

Conservation status
- Vulnerable (IUCN 3.1)

Scientific classification
- Kingdom: Animalia
- Phylum: Chordata
- Class: Aves
- Order: Procellariiformes
- Family: Hydrobatidae
- Genus: Hydrobates
- Species: H. matsudairae

Binomial name
- Hydrobates matsudairae (Kuroda, Nm, 1922)

Synonyms
- Oceanodroma matsudairae

= Matsudaira's storm petrel =

Species of bird

Matsudaira's storm petrel (Hydrobates matsudairae) is a species of seabird in the family Hydrobatidae.

It breeds solely in the Volcano Islands in the northwest Pacific Ocean, and winters in the Indian Ocean.

Its common name and Latin binomial commemorate the Japanese ornithologist Yorikatsu Matsudaira. It was formerly defined in the genus Oceanodroma before that genus was synonymized with Hydrobates. The genus name Bianchoma Mathews, 1943 was created for this particular species, though that name is now a synonym of Hydrobates.

As the image shows, Matsudaira's storm petrel can be told by its blackish alula feathers, which are offset by white bases to its dark primaries. The tail is long and greatly forked, and the beak is also lengthy with a pronounced hook at its tip.
