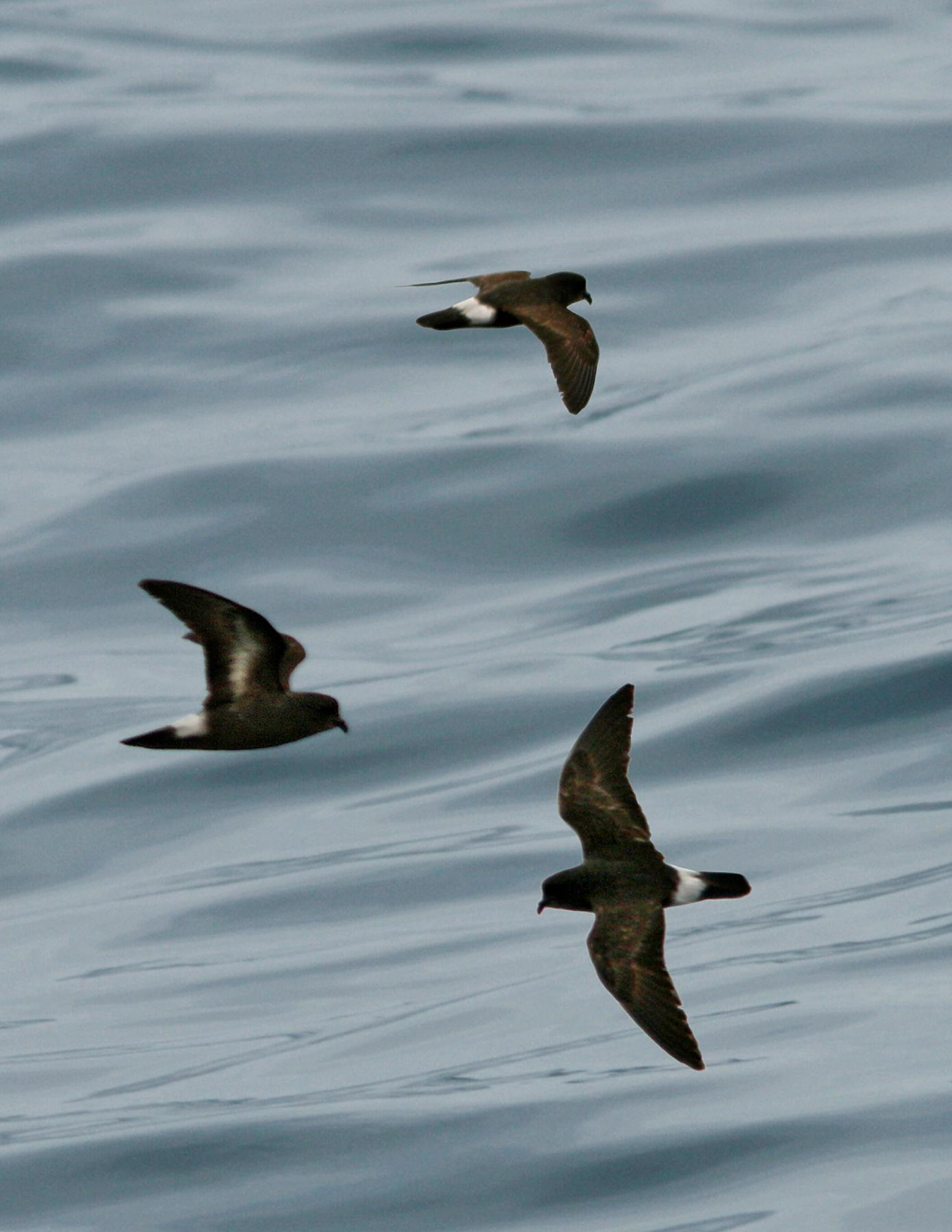
- European storm petrels The song of a European storm petrel, recorded on Skokholm Island, Pembrokeshire, Wales

Scientific classification
- Kingdom: Animalia
- Phylum: Chordata
- Class: Aves
- Order: Procellariiformes
- Family: Hydrobatidae; Mathews, 1912
- Genus: Hydrobates; F. Boie, 1822

Type species
- Procellaria pelagica (European storm petrel) Linnaeus, 1758

Species
- See text

Synonyms
- Oceanodroma Reichenbach, 1853 Thalassidroma Vigors, 1825 Zalochelidon Billberg, 1828 Cymochorea Coues, 1864 Halocyptena Coues, 1864 Pacificodroma Bianchi, 1913 Bannermania Mathews & Iredale, 1915 Tethysia Mathews, 1933 Loomelania Mathews, 1934 Bianchoma Mathews, 1943 Stonowa Mathews, 1943 Thalobata Mathews, 1943 Hydrobatinae (Mathews, 1912)

= Northern storm petrel =

Northern storm petrels

Genus and family of birds

Northern storm petrels are seabirds in the genus Hydrobates in the family Hydrobatidae, part of the order Procellariiformes. The family was once lumped with the similar austral storm petrels in the combined storm petrels, but have been split, as they are not closely related. These smallest of seabirds feed on planktonic crustaceans and small fish picked from the surface, typically while hovering. Their flight is fluttering and sometimes bat-like.

The northern storm petrels are found in the Northern Hemisphere, although some species around the Equator dip into the south. They are strictly pelagic, coming to land only when breeding. In the case of most species, little is known of their behaviour and distribution at sea, where they can be hard to find and harder to identify. They are colonial nesters, displaying strong philopatry to their natal colonies and nesting sites. Most species nest in crevices or burrows, and all but one species attend the breeding colonies nocturnally. Pairs form long-term, monogamous bonds and share incubation and chick-feeding duties. Like many species of seabirds, nesting is highly protracted, with incubation taking up to 50 days and fledging another 70 days after that.

Several species of storm petrel are threatened by human activities. One species, the Guadalupe storm petrel, is thought to have gone extinct. The principal threats to storm petrels are introduced species, particularly mammals, in their breeding colonies; many storm petrels habitually nest on isolated mammal-free islands and are unable to cope with predators such as rats and feral cats.

Up and down! - up and down!
From the base of the wave to the billow’s crown,
And amidst the flashing and feathery foam
The stormy petrel finds a home, -
A home, if such a place may be
For her who lives on the wide, wide sea.

O’er the deep! - o’er the deep!
Where the whale and the shark and the sword-fish sleep, -
Outflying the blast and the driving rain,
The petrel telleth her tale — in vain;
Yet he ne’er falters, - so, petrel, spring
Once more o’er the waves on thy stormy wing!

— From "The Stormy Petrel" poem by Barry Cornwall

== Taxonomy ==
The family Hydrobatidae was introduced with Hydrobates as the type genus by the Australian born ornithologist Gregory Mathews in 1912. The background is complicated as the family Hydrobatidae had originally been introduced in 1849 with Hydrobata as the type genus by the French zoologist Côme-Damien Degland. Hydrobata had been erected in 1816 for species in the dipper family Cinclidae by the French ornithologist Louis Pierre Vieillot. In 1992 the International Code of Zoological Nomenclature (ICZN) suppressed the genus Hydrobata Vieillot, 1816. Under the rules of the ICZN the family Hydrobatidae Degland, 1849 thus became unavailable as the type genus had been suppressed. This cleared the way for the family Hydrobatidae introduced in 1912 by Mathews.

The genus Hydrobates was erected in 1822 by the German zoologist Friedrich Boie. He listed two species but did not specify a type. In 1884 Spencer Baird, Thomas Brewer and Robert Ridgway designated the European storm petrel as the type species. The genus name combines the Ancient Greek hudro- meaning "water-" with batēs meaning "walker".

In the past two subfamilies, the Hydrobatinae and Oceanitinae, were recognized within a single large family Hydrobatidae, but this has since been split with the elevation of the Oceanitidae to family status. The Oceanitidae, or austral storm petrels, are mostly found in southern waters (though Wilson's storm petrel regularly migrates into the Northern Hemisphere). The Hydrobatidae, or northern storm petrels, are largely restricted to the Northern Hemisphere, although a few visit or breed a short distance south of the equator. The family Hydrobatidae originally included two genera Hydrobates and Oceanodroma. Cytochrome b DNA sequence analysis suggested that the family was paraphyletic and more accurately treated as two distinct families. A few fossil species have been found, with the earliest being from the Upper Miocene. In 2021, the IOC merged Hydrobates and Oceanodroma into the single genus Hydrobates, as the family was paraphyletic as previously defined.

The following cladogram shows the results of the phylogenetic analysis by Wallace et al. (2017).

- Hydrobates
  - - - Cape Verde storm petrel (H. jabejabe)
      - Monteiro's storm petrel (H. monteiroi)
    - - - Matsudaira's storm petrel (H. matsudairae)
        - Swinhoe's storm petrel (H. monorhis)
      - - Tristram's storm petrel (H. tristrami)
        - - - Leach's storm petrel (H. leucorhous)
            - Ringed storm petrel (H. hornbyi)
          - Ashy storm petrel (H. homochroa)
  - - - - Black storm petrel (H. melania)
        - Markham's storm petrel (H. markhami)
      - - Least storm petrel (H. microsoma)
        - Wedge-rumped storm petrel (H. tethys)
    - - European storm petrel (H. pelagicus)
      - Fork-tailed storm petrel (H. furcatus)

== Species ==
Common name	Scientific name	Status
European storm petrel	Hydrobates pelagicus	extant
Fork-tailed storm petrel	Hydrobates furcatus	extant
Ringed storm petrel	Hydrobates hornbyi	extant
Swinhoe's storm petrel	Hydrobates monorhis	extant
Matsudaira's storm petrel	Hydrobates matsudairae	extant
Leach's storm petrel	Hydrobates leucorhous	extant
Townsend's storm petrel	Hydrobates socorroensis	extant
Ainley's storm petrel	Hydrobates cheimomnestes	extant
Ashy storm petrel	Hydrobates homochroa	extant
Band-rumped storm petrel	Hydrobates castro	extant
Monteiro's storm petrel	Hydrobates monteiroi	extant
Cape Verde storm petrel	Hydrobates jabejabe	extant
Wedge-rumped storm petrel	Hydrobates tethys	extant
Black storm petrel	Hydrobates melania	extant
Guadalupe storm petrel	Hydrobates macrodactylus	possibly extinct
Markham's storm petrel	Hydrobates markhami	extant
Tristram's storm petrel	Hydrobates tristrami	extant
Least storm petrel	Hydrobates microsoma	extant

One species, the Guadalupe storm petrel (O. macrodactyla), is possibly extinct.

In 2010, the International Ornithological Congress (IOC) added the Cape Verde storm petrel (O. jabejabe) to their list of accepted species (AS) splits, following Bolton et al. 2007. This species was split from the band-rumped storm petrel (O. castro). In 2016, the IOC added Townsend's storm petrel (O. socorroensis) and Ainley's storm petrel (O. cheimomnestes) to their list of AS splits, following Howell 2012. These species were split from Leach's storm petrel (O. leucorhoa).

== Morphology and flight ==
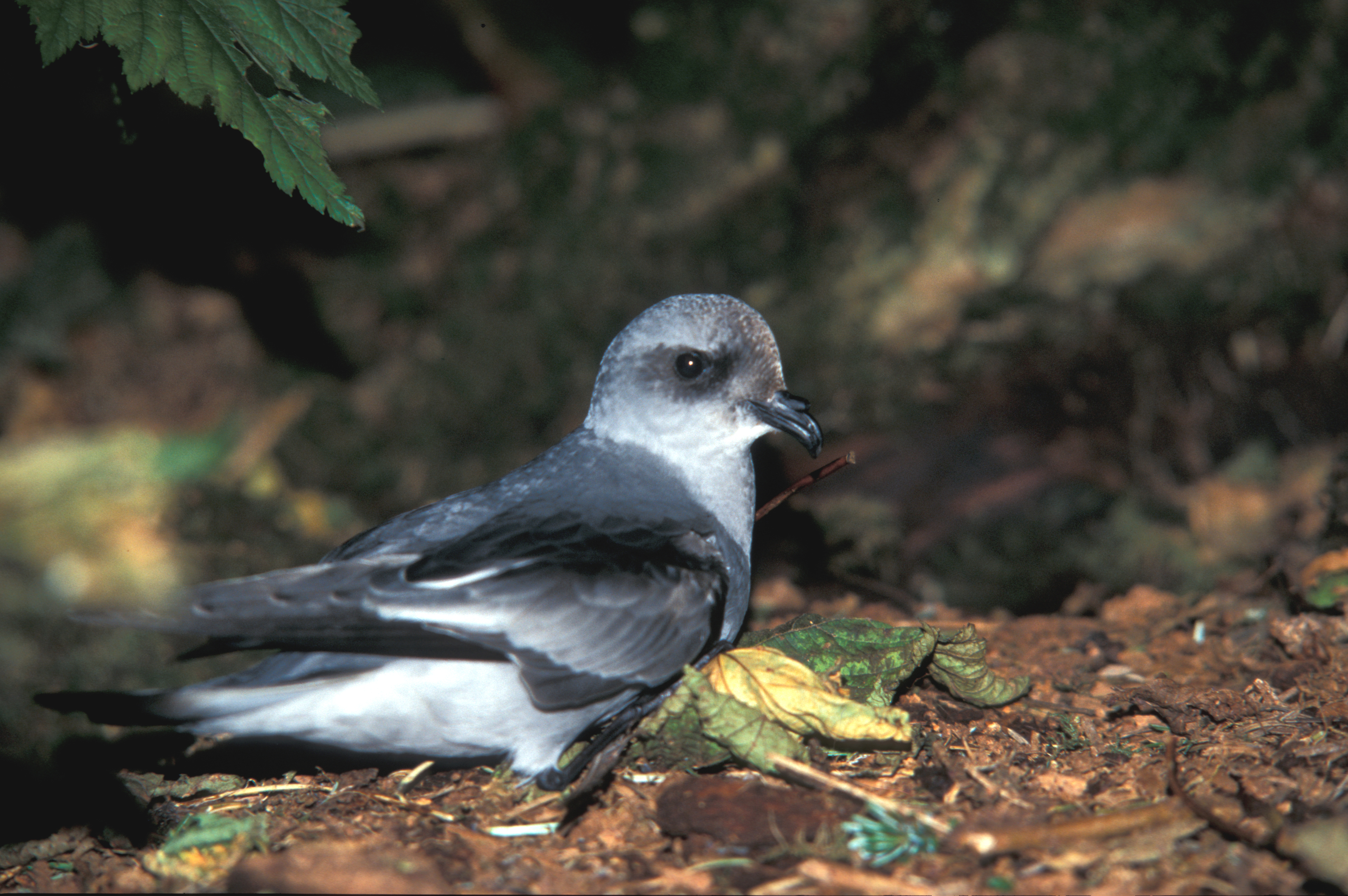
Unusually for the Hydrobatidae, the fork-tailed storm petrel has an all-grey plumage.

Northern storm petrels are the smallest of all the seabirds, ranging in size from 13 to 25 cm in length. The Hydrobatidae have longer wings than the austral storm petrels, forked or wedge-shaped tails, and shorter legs. The legs of all storm petrels are proportionally longer than those of other Procellariiformes, but they are very weak and unable to support the bird's weight for more than a few steps.

All but two of the Hydrobatidae are mostly dark in colour with varying amounts of white on the rump. Two species have different plumage entirely, the ringed storm petrel, which has white undersides and facial markings, and the fork-tailed storm petrel, which has pale grey plumage. This is a notoriously difficult group to identify at sea. Onley and Scofield (2007) state that much published information is incorrect, and that photographs in the major seabird books and websites are frequently ascribe species incorrectly. The same researchers also state that several national bird lists include species that have been incorrectly identified or have been accepted on inadequate evidence.

Storm petrels use a variety of techniques to aid flight. Most species occasionally feed by surface pattering, holding and moving their feet on the water's surface while holding steady above the water. They remain stationary by hovering with rapid fluttering or using the wind to anchor themselves in place. This method of feeding flight is more commonly used by Oceanitidae storm petrels, however. Northern storm petrels also use dynamic soaring, gliding across wave fronts gaining energy from the vertical wind gradient.

== Diet ==
The diet of many storm petrels species is poorly known owing to difficulties in researching; overall, the family is thought to concentrate on crustaceans. Small fish, oil droplets, and molluscs are also taken by many species. Some species are known to be rather more specialised; the grey-backed storm petrel is known to concentrate on the larvae of goose barnacles.

Almost all species forage in the pelagic zone. Although storm petrels are capable of swimming well and often form rafts on the water's surface, they do not feed on the water. Instead, feeding usually takes place on the wing, with birds hovering above or "walking" on the surface (see morphology) and snatching small morsels. Rarely, prey is obtained by making shallow dives under the surface.

Like many seabirds, storm petrels associate with other species of seabirds and marine mammal species to help obtain food. They may benefit from the actions of diving predators such as seals and penguins, which push prey up towards the surface while hunting, allowing the surface-feeding storm petrels to reach them.

== Distribution and movements ==
The Hydrobatidae are mostly found in the Northern Hemisphere.

Several species of northern storm petrel undertake migrations after the breeding season, of differing lengths; long ones, such as Swinhoe's storm petrel, which breeds in the west Pacific and migrates to the west Indian Ocean; or shorter ones, such as the black storm petrel, which nests in southern California and migrates down the coast of Central America as far south as Colombia. Some species, like Tristram's storm petrel, are thought to be essentially sedentary and do not undertake any migrations away from their breeding islands.

== Breeding ==
Storm petrels nest colonially, for the most part on islands, although a few species breed on the mainland, particularly Antarctica. Nesting sites are attended at night to avoid predators; the wedge-rumped storm petrels nesting in the Galapagos Islands are the exception to this rule and attend their nesting sites during the day. Storm petrels display high levels of philopatry, returning to their natal colonies to breed. In one instance, a band-rumped storm petrel was caught as an adult 2 m from its natal burrow. Storm petrels nest either in burrows dug into soil or sand, or in small crevices in rocks and scree. Competition for nesting sites is intense in colonies where storm petrels compete with other burrowing petrels, with shearwaters having been recorded killing storm petrels to occupy their burrows. Colonies can be extremely large and dense, with densities as high as 8 pairs/m^{2} for band-rumped storm petrels in the Galapagos and colonies 3.6 million strong for Leach's storm petrel have been recorded.

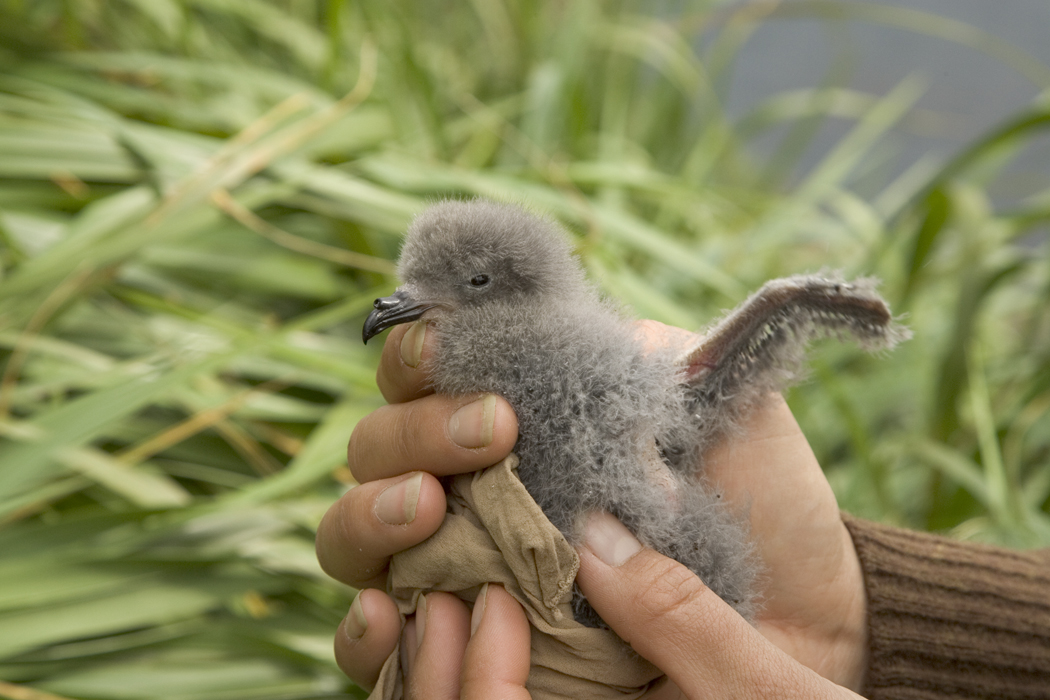
The chick of a fork-tailed storm petrel

Storm petrels are monogamous and form long-term pair bonds that last a number of years. Studies of paternity using DNA fingerprinting have shown that, unlike many other monogamous birds, infidelity (extra-pair mating) is very rare. As with the other Procellariiformes, a single egg is laid by a pair in a breeding season; if the egg fails, then usually no attempt is made to lay again (although it happens rarely). Both sexes incubate in shifts of up to six days. The egg hatches after 40 or 50 days; the young is brooded continuously for another 7 days or so before being left alone in the nest during the day and fed by regurgitation at night. Meals fed to the chick weigh around 10–20% of the parent's body weight, and consist of both prey items and stomach oil. Stomach oil is an energy-rich (its calorific value is around 9.6 kcal/g) oil created by partly digested prey in a part of the fore gut known as the proventriculus. By partly converting prey items into stomach oil, storm petrels can maximise the amount of energy chicks receive during feeding, an advantage for small seabirds that can only make a single visit to the chick during a 24-hour period (at night). The typical age at which chicks fledge depends on the species, taking between 50 and 70 days. The time taken to hatch and raise the young is long for the bird's size, but is typical of seabirds, which in general are K-selected, living much longer, delaying breeding for longer, and investing more effort into fewer young. The young leave their burrows around 62 days. They are independent almost at once and quickly disperse into the ocean. They return to their original colony after 2 or 3 years, but will not breed until at least 4 years old. Storm petrels have been recorded living as long as 30 years.

== Threats and conservation ==
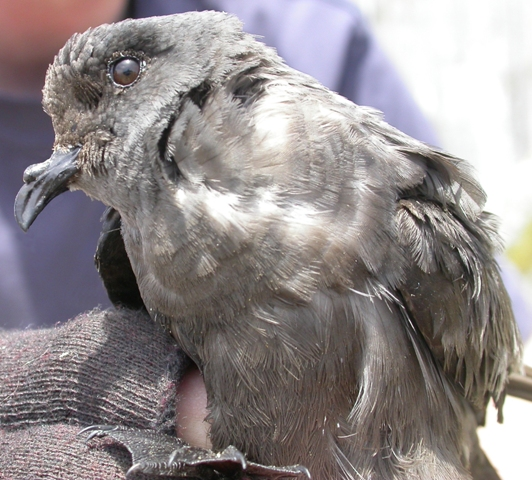
The decline of the ashy storm petrel has led to it being declared an endangered species by the IUCN.

Several species of storm petrel are threatened by human activities. The Guadalupe storm petrel has not been observed since 1906 and most authorities consider it extinct. One species (the ashy storm petrel) is listed as endangered by the IUCN due to a 42% decline over 20 years. For the ringed storm petrel, even the sites of their breeding colonies remain a mystery.

Storm petrels face the same threats as other seabirds; in particular, they are threatened by introduced species. The Guadalupe storm petrel was driven to extinction by feral cats, and introduced predators have also been responsible for declines in other species. Habitat degradation, which limits nesting opportunities, caused by introduced goats and pigs is also a problem, especially if it increases competition from more aggressive burrowing petrels.

== Cultural representation of the storm petrel ==
"Petrel" is thought to be a diminutive form of "Peter", a reference to Saint Peter, given to these birds because they sometimes appear to walk across the water's surface. The more specific "storm petrel" or "stormy petrel" is a reference to their habit of hiding in the lee of ships during storms. Early sailors named these birds "Mother Carey's chickens" because they were thought to warn of oncoming storms; this name is based on a corrupted form of Mater Cara, a name for the Blessed Virgin Mary.

Up and down! - up and down!
From the base of the wave to the billow’s crown...
Outflying the blast and the driving rain,
The petrel telleth her tale — in vain!

— This excerpt of "The Stormy Petrel" by Barry Cornwall refers to the birds' appearance forewarning storms

Breton folklore holds that storm petrels are the spirits of sea-captains who mistreated their crew, doomed to spend eternity flying over the sea, and they are also held to be the souls of drowned sailors. A sailing superstition holds that the appearance of a storm petrel foretells bad weather. Sinister names from Britain and France include waterwitch, satanite, satanique, and oiseau du diable.

=== Symbol of revolution ===
The association of the storm petrel with turbulent weather has led to its use as a metaphor for revolutionary views, the epithet "stormy petrel" being applied by various authors to characters as disparate as a Roman tribune, a Presbyterian minister in the early Carolinas, an Afghan governor, or an Arkansas politician. Russian revolutionary writer Maxim Gorky bore the epithet "the Stormy Petrel of the Revolution" (Буревестник Революции), presumably due to his authorship of the famous 1901 poem "Song of the Stormy Petrel".

In "Song of the Stormy Petrel", Gorki turned to the imagery of subantarctic avifauna to describe Russian society's attitudes to the coming revolution. The storm petrel was depicted as unafraid of the coming storm –the revolution. This poem was called "the battle anthem of the revolution", and earned Gorky himself the title of the "Storm Petrel of the Revolution". While this English translation of the bird's name may not be a very ornithologically accurate translation of the Russian burevestnik (буревестник), it is poetically appropriate, as burevestnik literally means "the announcer of the storm". To honour Gorky and his work, the name Burevestnik was bestowed on a variety of institutions, locations, and products in the USSR.

The motif of the stormy petrel has a long association with revolutionary anarchism. Various groups adopted the bird's name, either as a group identifier, as in the Spanish Civil War, or for their publications. "Stormy Petrel" was the title of a German anarchist paper of the late 19th century; it was also the name of a Russian exile anarchist communist group operating in Switzerland in the early 20th century. The Stormy Petrel (Burevestnik) was the title of the magazine of the Anarchist Communist Federation in Russia around the time of the 1905 revolution, and is still an imprint of the London group of the Anarchist Federation of Britain and Ireland. Writing in 1936, Emma Goldman referred to Buenaventura Durruti as "this stormy petrel of the anarchist and revolutionary movement".
