= Ainley's storm petrel =

Conservation status
- Vulnerable (IUCN 3.1)

Scientific classification
- Kingdom: Animalia
- Phylum: Chordata
- Class: Aves
- Order: Procellariiformes
- Family: Hydrobatidae
- Genus: Hydrobates
- Species: H. cheimomnestes

Binomial name
- Hydrobates cheimomnestes (Ainley, 1980)
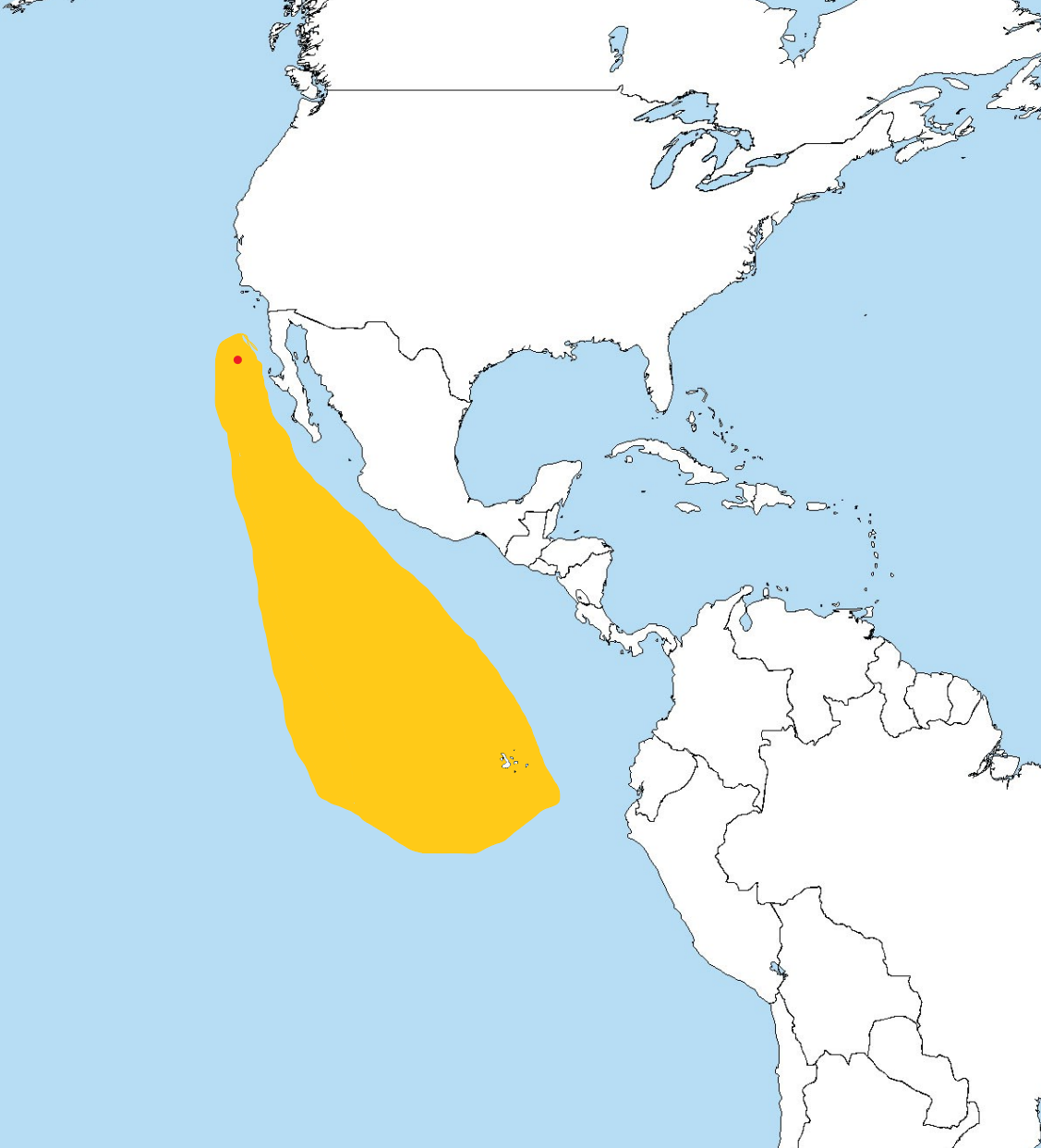

Synonyms
- Oceanodroma cheimomnestes

Species of bird

Ainley's storm petrel (Hydrobates cheimomnestes) is a species of seabird in the family Hydrobatidae. It breeds in the winter on Guadalupe Island off the western coast of Mexico. It ranges south to the Galápagos Islands. It is considered by some authorities to be a subspecies of Leach's storm petrel.

== Taxonomy ==
This species was first described as a subspecies of Leach's storm petrel (Hydrobates leucorhoa), by the United States marine ornithologist David Ainley. He distinguished it on grounds of physiology, morphology and voice, separating it from Townsend's storm petrel (Hydrobates socorroensis) which breeds on the same islands in the summer whereas Hydrobates cheimomnestes breeds in the winter. The species name cheimomnestes means "winter suitor", in reference to the fact that this bird breeds in the winter. There is still disagreement among authorities as to whether it should be regarded as a separate species. It is recognised as such by Avibase, but not by the International Union for Conservation of Nature. It was formerly defined in the genus Oceanodroma before that genus was synonymized with Hydrobates.

== Description ==
Ainley's storm petrel is a medium-sized species about 18 cm (7.1 in) long, with fairly long wings with blunt points, and a moderately long, forked tail. The general colour is dark sooty-brown but from a distance this appears black; pre-moult adults may look more brownish when the plumage is worn. The rump is white, a U-shaped white patch having a central poorly defined dark area. The beak, legs and feet are black, and the feet do not extend beyond the tail in flight. It is only slightly different from other related species such as the Townsend's storm petrel and Leach's storm petrel

== Ecology ==
This bird spends much time away from land over open ocean, where its habits are likely to be similar to Leach's storm petrel (Hydrobates leucorhoa). During the breeding season it occurs on the waters off the Baja California Peninsula. It is only known to breed on three islets off the southern end of Guadalupe Island, Mexico. At the breeding colonies, this bird is nocturnal. It nests in crevices and burrows, and the total world population probably does not exceed a few thousand birds.
