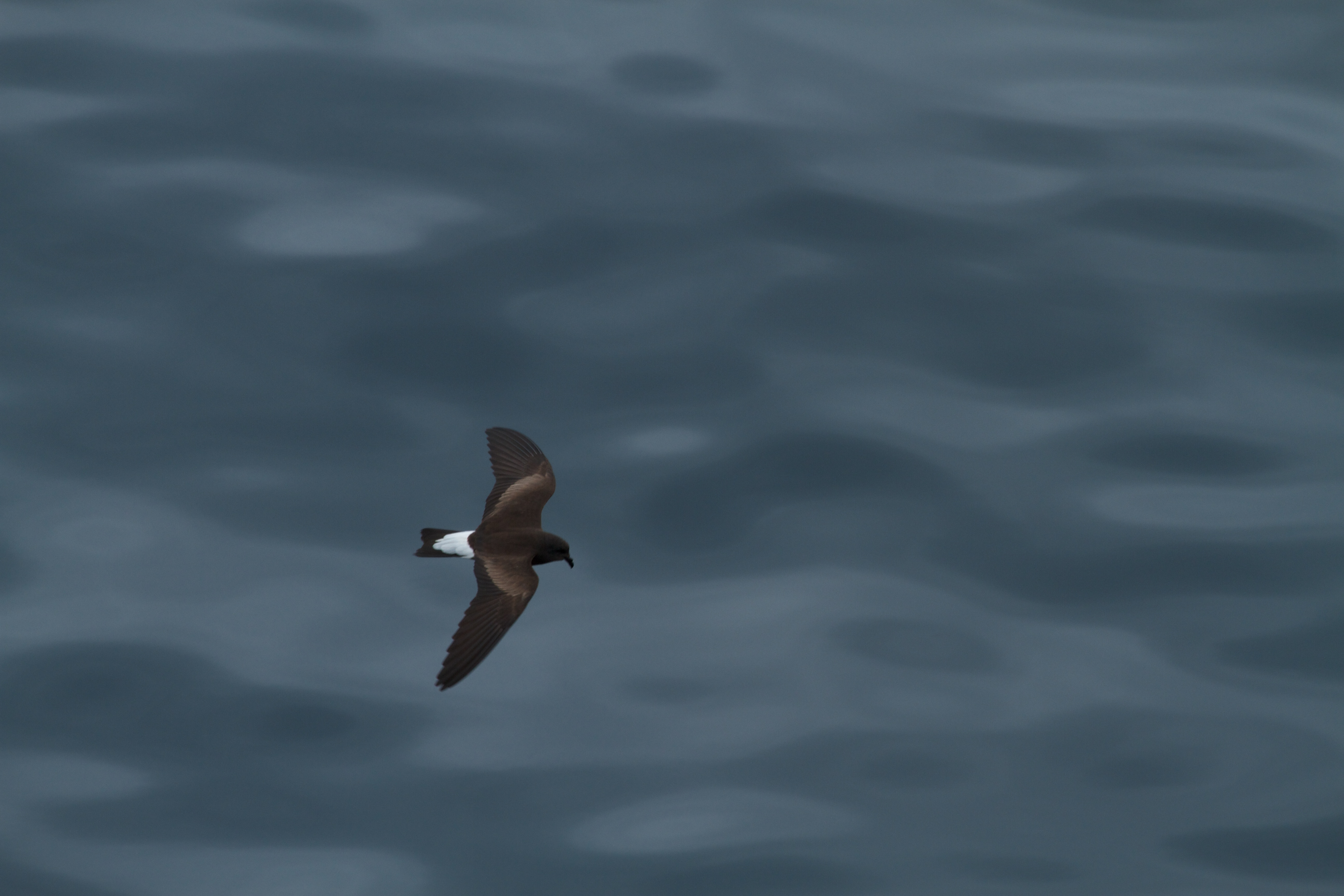

Conservation status
- Least Concern (IUCN 3.1)

Scientific classification
- Kingdom: Animalia
- Phylum: Chordata
- Class: Aves
- Order: Procellariiformes
- Family: Hydrobatidae
- Genus: Hydrobates
- Species: H. tethys

Binomial name
- Hydrobates tethys (Bonaparte, 1852)

Synonyms
- Oceanodroma tethys

= Wedge-rumped storm petrel =

Wedge-rumped storm-petrel

Species of bird

The wedge-rumped storm-petrel (Hydrobates tethys) is a species of northern storm petrel. It breeds in the Galápagos Islands and on the coast of Peru. It was formerly defined in the genus Oceanodroma before that genus was synonymized with Hydrobates.

In October 2026, wedge-rumped storm-petrels carried by Hurricane Rachel were sighted throughout Utah, exciting birders across the state. The sightings were the most northern and inland the species has ever been documented.
