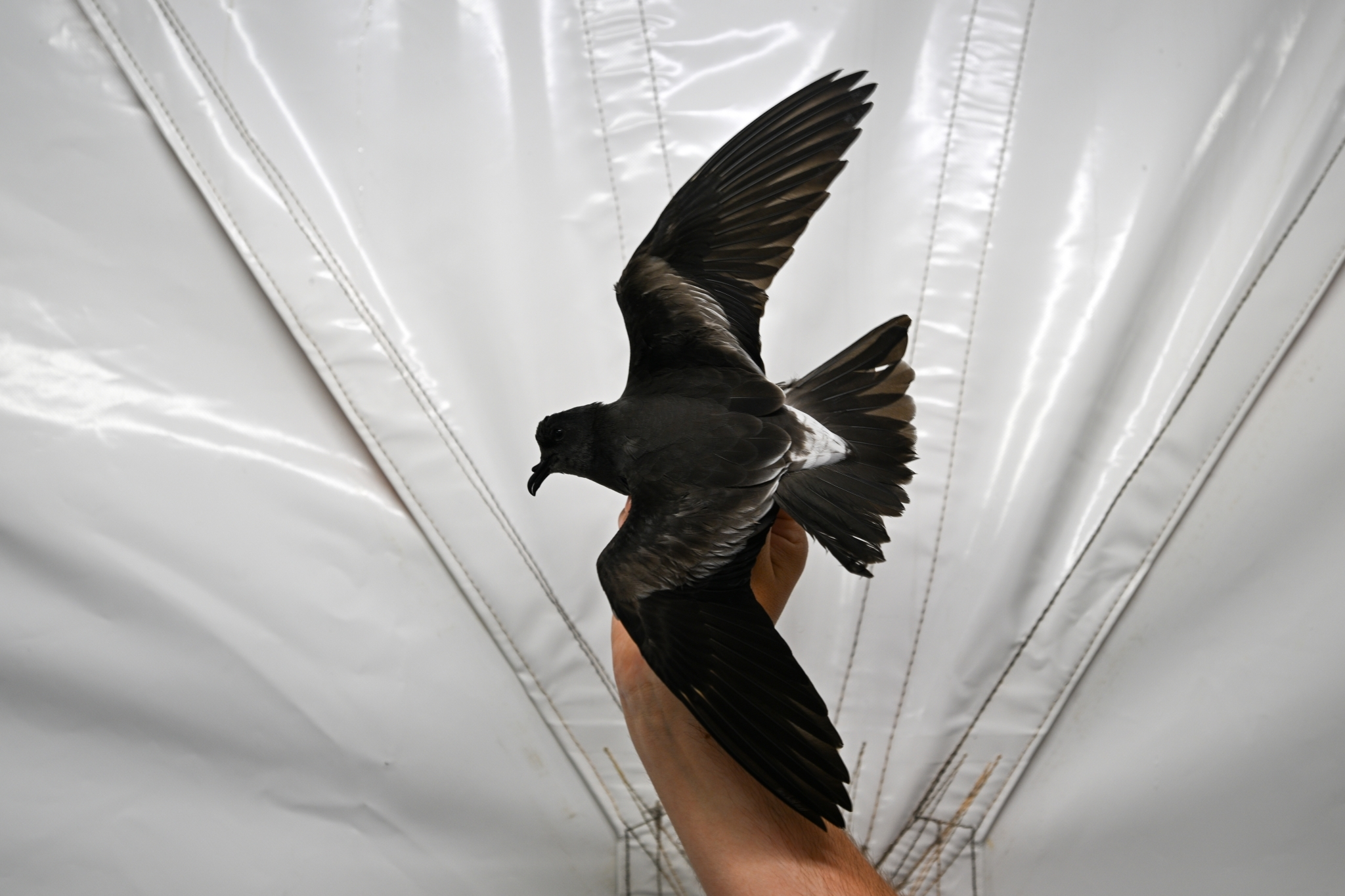

Conservation status
- Least Concern (IUCN 3.1)

Scientific classification
- Kingdom: Animalia
- Phylum: Chordata
- Class: Aves
- Order: Procellariiformes
- Family: Hydrobatidae
- Genus: Hydrobates
- Species: H. jabejabe

Binomial name
- Hydrobates jabejabe (Barbosa du Bocage, 1875)

Synonyms
- Oceanodroma jabejabe

= Cape Verde storm petrel =

Species of bird

The Cape Verde storm petrel (Hydrobates jabejabe) is an oceangoing bird found in the Atlantic Ocean, especially around the islands of Cape Verde. It was at one time considered to be a subspecies of the band-rumped storm petrel, but is now considered to be a separate species by the International Ornithological Congress and other authorities.

They breed much of year but most nest in the winter. They are mainly nocturnal.

== Description ==
This bird is darker in plumage and the white rump is less conspicuous than Leach's storm petrel.
