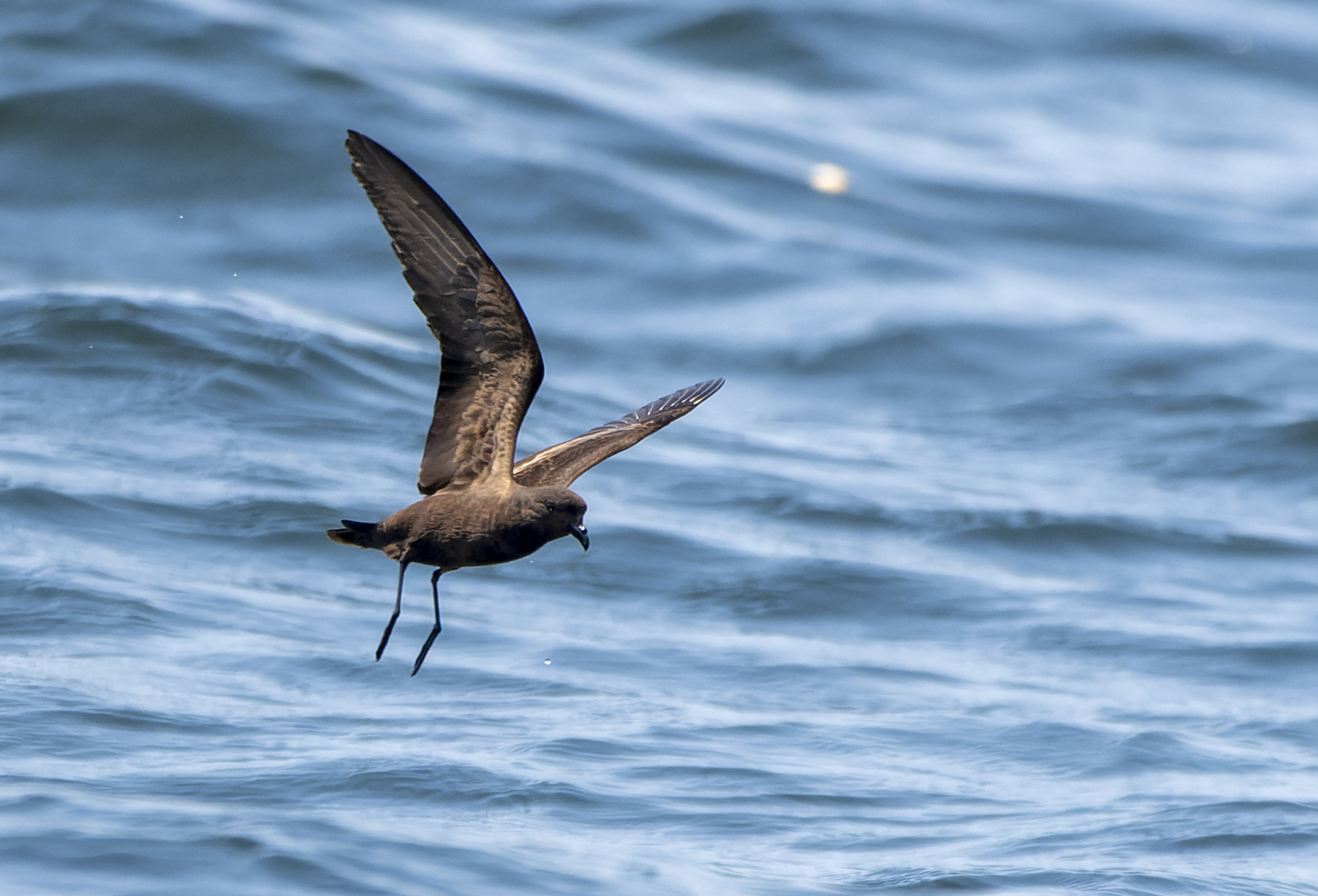

Conservation status
- Least Concern (IUCN 3.1)

Scientific classification
- Kingdom: Animalia
- Phylum: Chordata
- Class: Aves
- Order: Procellariiformes
- Family: Hydrobatidae
- Genus: Hydrobates
- Species: H. melania

Binomial name
- Hydrobates melania (Bonaparte, 1854)

Synonyms
- Oceanodroma melania | Oceanodroma melania melania | Loomelania melania | Procellaria melania

= Black storm petrel =

Largest North American member of the storm-petrel family Hydrobatidae

The black storm-petrel (Hydrobates melania) is the largest North American member of the storm-petrel family, Hydrobatidae. It is a highly pelagic seabird found present across the coast of central California to the coast of Peru.

== Description ==
=== Size, Morphology and Proportions ===
The black storm-petrel is the largest of North-American storm-petrels. This full looking, all-black seabird measures 8.5-9 inches in length, 19-21 inches in wingspan and weighs roughly 60 g. The wings of this small seabird are notably long, angled, sharp and agile looking. The wingspan of this bird is over twice the birds length. The deeply forked tail of this species is a key characteristic for identification, with a "V" shaped notch of up to 20mm in depth. Its tarsus is notably longer than its culmen or middle toe with claw often measuring more than 28 mm. Like other procellariiforms, the black storm-petrel's external nostrils are fused to the base of its bill. Its possesses black webbed feet, brown irises and emits a musky odour.

=== Plumage ===
The black storm-petrel is completely dark lacking white patches on the rump or undertail seen in other dark hydrobates. Its plumage is predominantly blackish or dark brown, often described as sooty and accompanied with a faint sooty shine on the head, neck and mantle in younger individuals which later fades with wear of the feathers. A distinctive pale brown, tawny-gray wing bar extends across the upper wing coverts and stops short at the wrist of the wing. All sexes and age classes possess 10 primary flight feathers and look identical year-round. Aberrant or leucistic plumages are rare in this species compared to other storm-petrel species.

==== Moult ====
The black storm-petrel exhibits a simple basic moult strategy. The moult sequence is consistent across sexes and geographical range. After birth, from July to October, they develop a thick, long grayish-brown down which lightens in colour as the chick grows. They gradually shed this natal down as the first prebasic plumage sets in. Growing from July to October, the wings are plumed first between 6-8 weeks and the chick is usually fully feathered by week 9-10.

After fledging, this first prebasic coat is gradually replaced from October to August while the bird is at sea. This newer set of feathers makes up the first basic plumage of this species and features thinner fringes on coverts.

As flight feathers gradually become browner and abraded by spring, the storm-petrel initiates a complete moult. From April to November, subadult black storm-petrels complete this cycle faster than adults as they are not constrained by the cost of reproduction.

The black storm-petrels wear this dark cloak from October to September of the following year. Their plumage lightens with wear and appears browner during breeding season. These small procellariids will then initiate their annual prebasic moult refreshing their veneer and gaining their sooty shine once more during winter.

=== Flight ===
Black storm-petrels have relatively slow, deliberate and direct flight patterns similar to those of a black tern or nighthawk. Its wingbeats are deep and interspersed with short glides, with rising motions often bringing the wings above the horizontal plane preparing the next downward motion. A recent GPS tracking study using miniature devices revealed that they can reach ground speeds between 3.15-7.9 m/s. To optimize flight efficiency, the birds strategically navigate through crosswinds and tailwinds, utilizing the wind like an invisible highway. It is often seen arching over wavetop in the manner of a small shearwater. This species, like many other seabirds, is known to adapt its flight style with lighter winds resulting in quicker and shallower wingbeats whereas stronger winds will allow for longer glides.

== Field Identification ==
This is the largest of the North-American storm-petrels and looks rather "full" compared to other species of hydrobates. The general jizz of this bird in flight is that of a tern or nighthawk with deep and high rising wing strokes. Lighter wingbars are present on their wings but do not extend to the leading edge of the wing. This bird is typically seen gliding and flapping in a shearwater-like manner and may flock with other hydrobates around food abundant patches. When seen "walking" on water, the notably long tarsus may help identification, although relative size is probably the best clue.

=== Similar Species ===
Markham's Storm-Petrel (Hydrobates markhami): This is the most difficult lookalike as its marine range overlaps greatly (from Mexico to Peru). While these are similar in size and colouration, Markham's usually exhibits a slightly longer wings and tail, which is also more deeply forked. Its pale upperwing bar extends fully to the leading edge of the wing contrary to those of the black storm-petrel. Markham's also possesses a shallower bill and shorter tarsus. It usually lacks the power of flight of the black storm-petrel and appears to fly leisurely not uncommonly flying higher than the latter species which tends to stay close to the water surface.

Leach's Storm-petrel (Hydrobates leucorhous): While having a similar flap-glide pattern to the black storm-petrel, the Leach's is significantly smaller and presents a white patch on the rump with more erratic movements in flight.

Ashy (Hydrobates homochroa) and Least (Hydrobates microsoma) Storm-Petrels: Both of these species' range overlap with that of the black storm-petrel but both of these species are smaller and present different proportions. The ashy is generally paler compared to the black storm-petrel. These two species flap almost continuously and tend to stay lower around the waves.

Potential vagrants: Tristam's Storm-petrel (Hydrobates tristrami) , Matsudaira's Storm-petrel (Hydrobates matsudairae)

== Taxonomy ==
The black storm-petrel was formerly described in 1854 by the French ornithologist, naturalist and nephew of Napoleon Bonaparte: Charles Lucien Bonaparte. Bonaparte first placed this species in the genus Procellaria and coined the binomial name Procellaria melania . This species taxonomic placement has historically been fluid and revised several times. For many years, it was classified under the genus Oceanodroma as Oceanodroma melania. Based on this bird's notably long legs, it was later placed in the genus Loomelania, although this genus is now considered obsolete. Other phylogenies have also proposed placing them in the genus Halocyptena alongside the least and galapagos storm-petrels.

The epithet melania refers to the melanin conferring the black storm-petrel its namely black colour. The alternate genus name Halocyptena was derived from the Greek hals ("sea" or "salt") and okypteros ("swift-winged"). Its genus name was later changed to Hydrobates melania from the ancient Greek hydro ("water") and bates ("walker"). The former genus name carried a similar meaning, from the Greek still, signifying "ocean-runner".

The black storm-petrel is monotypic species member of the order Procellariiformes, which comprises the tubenosed seabirds such as albatrosses, petrels, and shearwaters. Its family, Hydrobatidae, includes the northern storm-petrels. Currently, the species is classified in the genus Hydrobates under the accepted scientific name Hydrobates melania.

== Habitat and Distribution ==
The black storm-petrel's breeding range is restricted to small rocky islands and talus slopes off the coasts of southern California and northwestern Mexico, including both coasts of Baja California and the Gulf of California. Notable colonies are located on Santa Barbara Island, Islas San Benito, and Islas Coronado.

Following the breeding season, these birds disperse widely across the eastern Pacific Ocean. Their non-breeding marine range extends as far south as northern Peru and north to central California. The black storm-petrels visit the coasts of Panama and in Ecuador from November to June, though some non-breeding subadults may remain in South American waters year-round. During El Niño events, and periods of oceanic warming, black storm-petrel populations frequently move northward and become late summer sightings along the Californian coast. This small seabird is a casual vagrant as far as northern Oregon and individuals are occasionally swept inland into the Salton Sea and other inland water bodies.

Outside of the breeding season, the species is highly pelagic but strongly associated with the continental shelf and slope. They prefer warmer waters and concentrate their foraging over productive oceanographic fronts. They can often be observed within a few kilometers of the shore in areas where the continental shelf is narrow and not further than 360 km from the coast.

== Behaviour ==
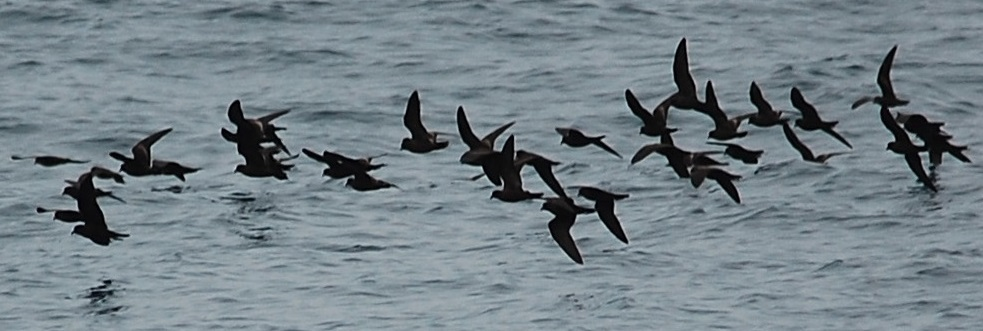
Group off the coast of Northern California

=== Vocalization ===
Black storm-petrels are usually silent while at sea and away from their breeding grounds. On colony grounds, however, these sea swallows are highly vocal. They emit calls from their nests and while in flight. Interestingly, chicks can begin vocalizing from within the egg at least two days prior to hatching.

The primary burrow call is a strong and rapid rattling "churr" that lasts up to 10-12 seconds. This call rapidly swells from a delicate beginning and ends abruptly, usually followed by a short pause between churrs. These prolonged calls show similarities with ones produced by the least storm-petrel although much more enunciated and emphatic. Their flight calls are shrieky and rough, often described as "kreeih kreehr kree-kree-kree-kreehr" or "krii ki-ki-kihr", and exhibit an accelerating end.

=== Diet & Foraging ===
The black storm-petrel feeds primarily on zooplankton, crustaceans, larval fish, squid and other small marine animals. Like other procellariids, the black storm-petrel uses its highly developed sense of olfaction to locate prey concentrations, and to scavenge on floating dead organisms or offal.

When foraging, this black seabird is often seen flying low to the water surface with their wings raised picking up food from the water surface while briefly "walking on water". These birds are also known to ingest small bits of floating pumice, storing them in their gizzard to later help grind ingested items. While relatively solitary while foraging, this species is known to gather in large flocks around abundant prey patches and to frequently follow ships. To reduce intraspecific competition, male and female black storm-petrels exhibit intersexual niche segregation. Furthermore, they are known to maintain year-round spatial and dietary niche segregation from other storm-petrels sharing the eastern Pacific waters.

=== Reproduction ===
==== Nesting Sites & Phenology ====
Black storm-petrels are colonial breeders that nest in natural rock crevices or orifices and in fissures on talus slopes. Contrary to other species of storm-petrels that excavate their own burrows, black storm-petrels rely on natural cavities or reuse burrows originally dug by larger seabirds such as Cassin's auklet and murrelet. Pairs appear to be monogamous and exhibit high nest site fidelity, reusing an refurbishing the same nest chamber by scratching out accumulated dirt. Initial colony visits as early as late January in the Gulf of California and as late as April on Santa-Barbara Island.

==== Eggs & Incubation ====
Female black storm-petrels lay a single, dull white egg per season. This single eggs averages 36.6x26.7 mm in size and 11.4 g in weight. There is usually no replacement of brood in case of loss with exceptions where a second egg may be laid after the loss of the first. Most eggs are laid from mid-May to mid-June and the incubation period lasts between 40-53 days. Both sexes develop a brood patch and share incubation duties, though egg neglect is not uncommon especially during the first week. The black storm-petrel's egg can be left unattended 1-2 days without affecting its viability but with a cost of an extended total incubation time.

==== Chick Rearing & Fledging ====
This species, like other storm-petrels, lives a large portion of their life in darkness. In fact, the chick is born in the darkness of its burrow weighing roughly 9-17 g and is reliant on its parents to feed it until it fledges. To maximize the quantity of energy provided to their chicks, adults convert their prey into a nutrient-dense stomach oil that they regurgitate during feedings. However, as reproductive success is highly reliant on parental feeding it was hypothesized that environmental conditions may affect fledgling success, but no relationship was found between the latter. Fledging occurs at 11-12 weeks of age, once more under the cover of the night. Black storm-petrel fledglings will then first witness light while at sea, fully independent of their parents.

== Symbolism and Relationship to Humans ==
The name storm-petrel is deeply rooted in maritime folklore and draws from religious roots. Indeed, the word “petrel” is derived from Saint Peter or the Spanish and Portuguese equivalent Pedro which refers to a biblical account of the saint walking on water. The name was then bestowed upon these small birds by sailors as they appear to be walking on the waves when foraging. The prefix “storm” was added as seafarers witnessed these small tubenoses seeking shelter in the lee of their ships during heavy weather events and from there these birds came to be known as storm-petrels.

Historically, sailors further referred to them as "Mother Carey's chickens". This surname is believed to have evolved from the incantation "mata cara," meaning "dear mother," which was chanted by sailors asking for divine protection during rough seas. Due to this deep, almost spiritual association with the sea and survival, maritime superstition dictated that it was bad luck to kill a storm-petrel. Conversely, because these birds seemed to thrive in the hellish conditions of violent squalls, superstitious seafarers also dubbed them "satanites," "water witches," and "birds of the devil".

Beyond its folkloric surnames, the black storm-petrel is also occasionally referred to by the alternative common names "great-winged storm-petrel" or "black petrel".
