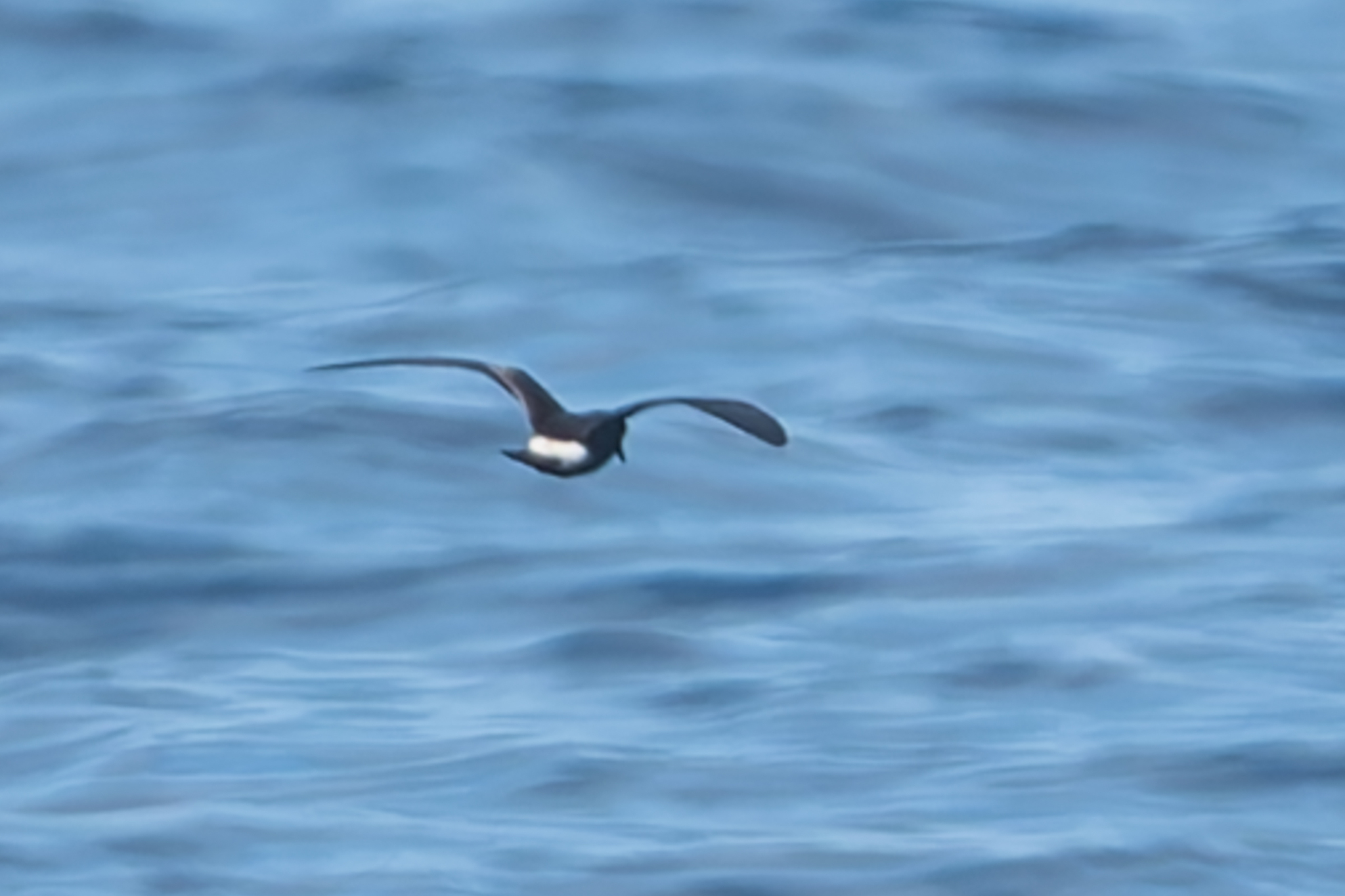

Conservation status
- Endangered (IUCN 3.1)

Scientific classification
- Kingdom: Animalia
- Phylum: Chordata
- Class: Aves
- Order: Procellariiformes
- Family: Hydrobatidae
- Genus: Hydrobates
- Species: H. socorroensis

Binomial name
- Hydrobates socorroensis (Townsend, CH, 1890)
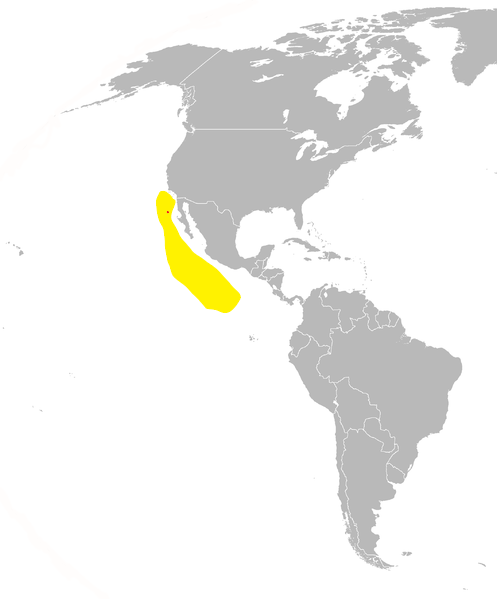

Synonyms
- Oceanodroma socorroensis Townsend, 1890; Oceanodroma kaedingi Anthony, 1898

= Townsend's storm petrel =

Species of bird

Townsend's storm petrel (Hydrobates socorroensis) is a species of seabird in the family Hydrobatidae. It breeds in the summer on rocks and islets of Guadalupe Island off the western coast of Mexico. It ranges in the Eastern Pacific Ocean north to southern California in the United States and south to 10°N latitude. It used to be considered a subspecies of the Leach's storm petrel. It was formerly defined in the genus Oceanodroma before that genus was synonymized with Hydrobates.
