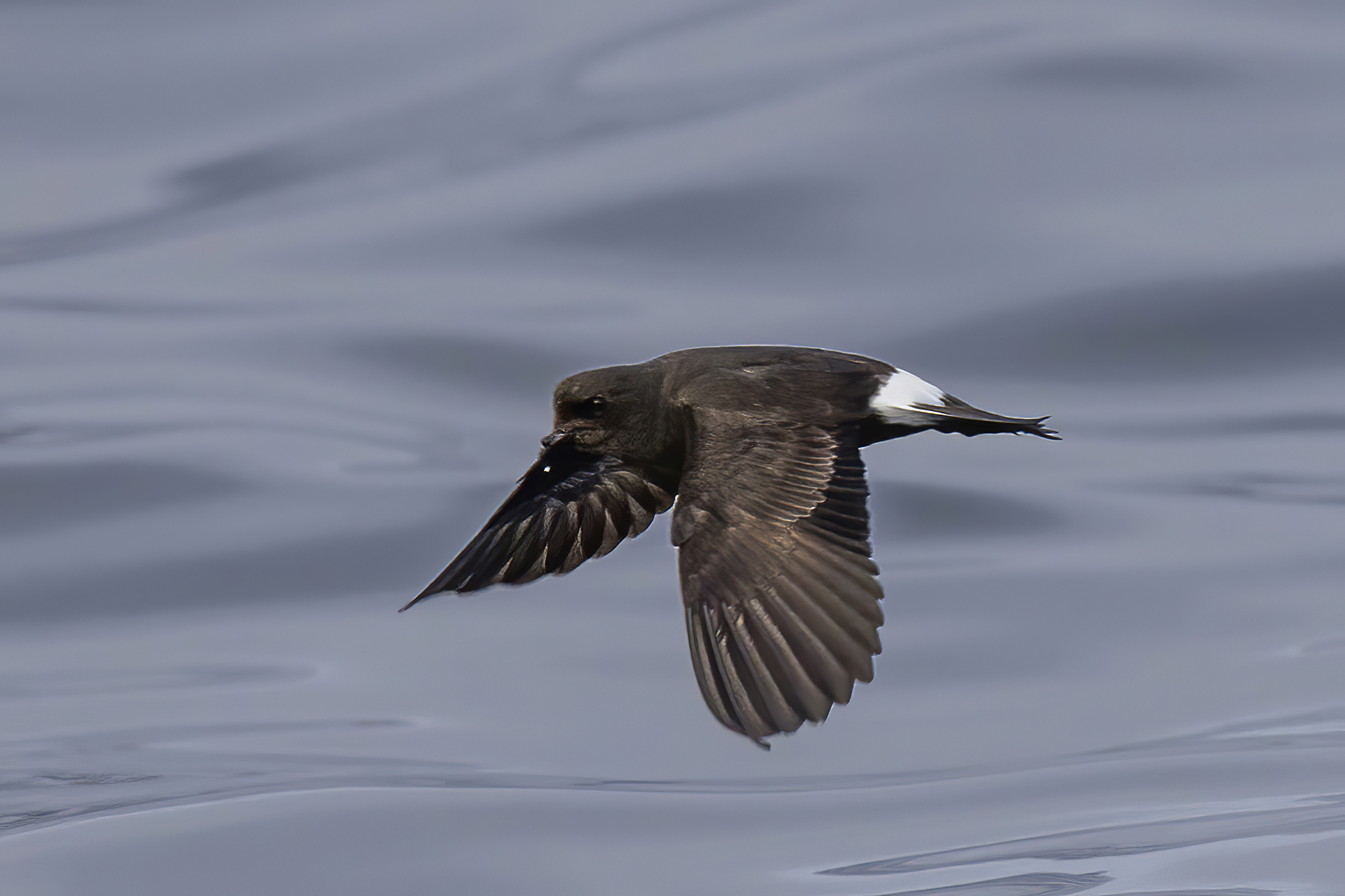
- Ten miles off Sagres, Portugal
- Storm petrel churring calls

Conservation status
- Least Concern (IUCN 3.1)

Scientific classification
- Kingdom: Animalia
- Phylum: Chordata
- Class: Aves
- Order: Procellariiformes
- Family: Hydrobatidae
- Genus: Hydrobates
- Species: H. pelagicus

Binomial name
- Hydrobates pelagicus (Linnaeus, 1758)

Subspecies
- H. p. pelagicus (Linnaeus, 1758); H. p. melitensis (Schembri, 1843)
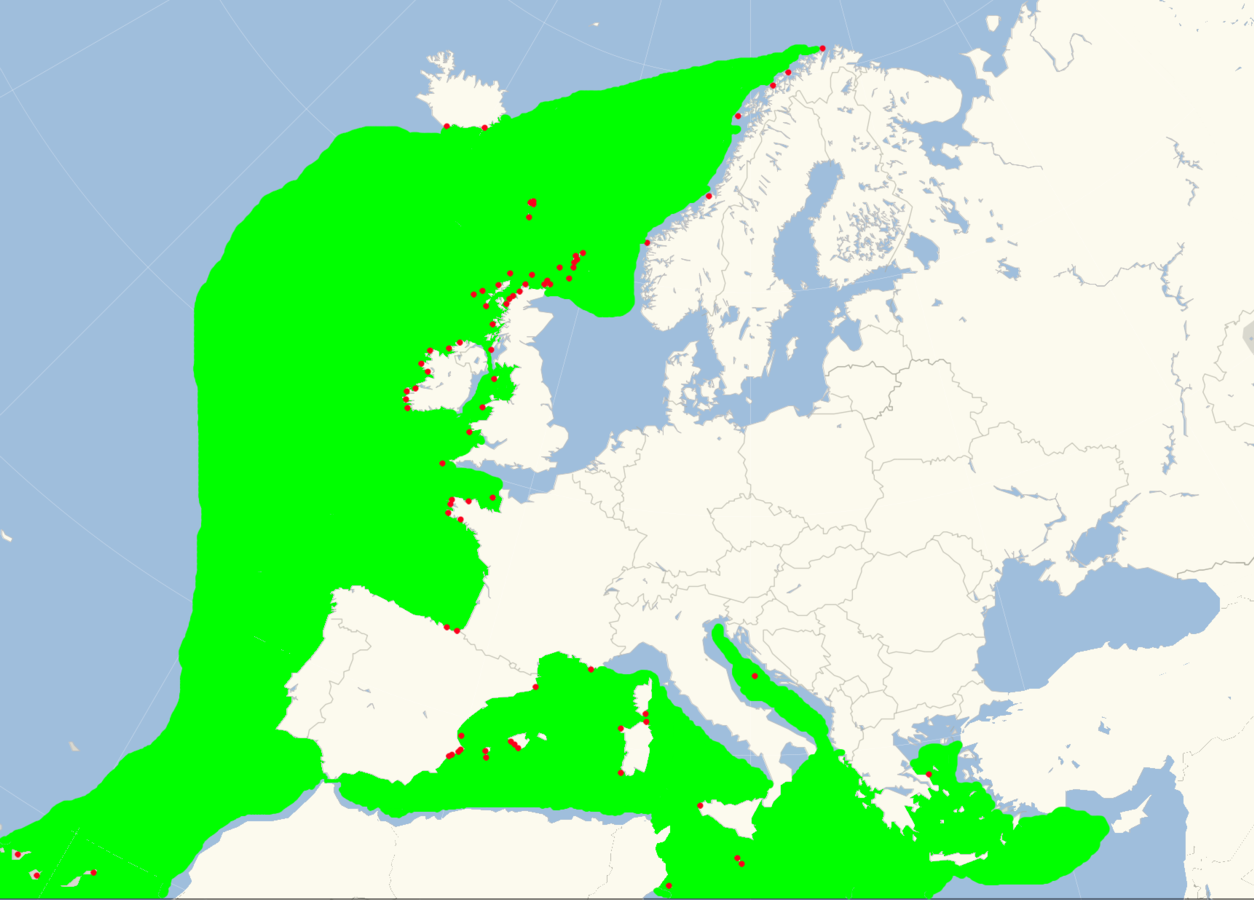
- European and Mediterranean range of H. pelagicus (Full range extends into the South Atlantic Ocean) Known or probable breeding colonies At-sea range in Northern Hemisphere summer

Synonyms
- Procellaria pelagica Linnaeus, 1758

= European storm petrel =

Migratory seabird in the family Hydrobatidae

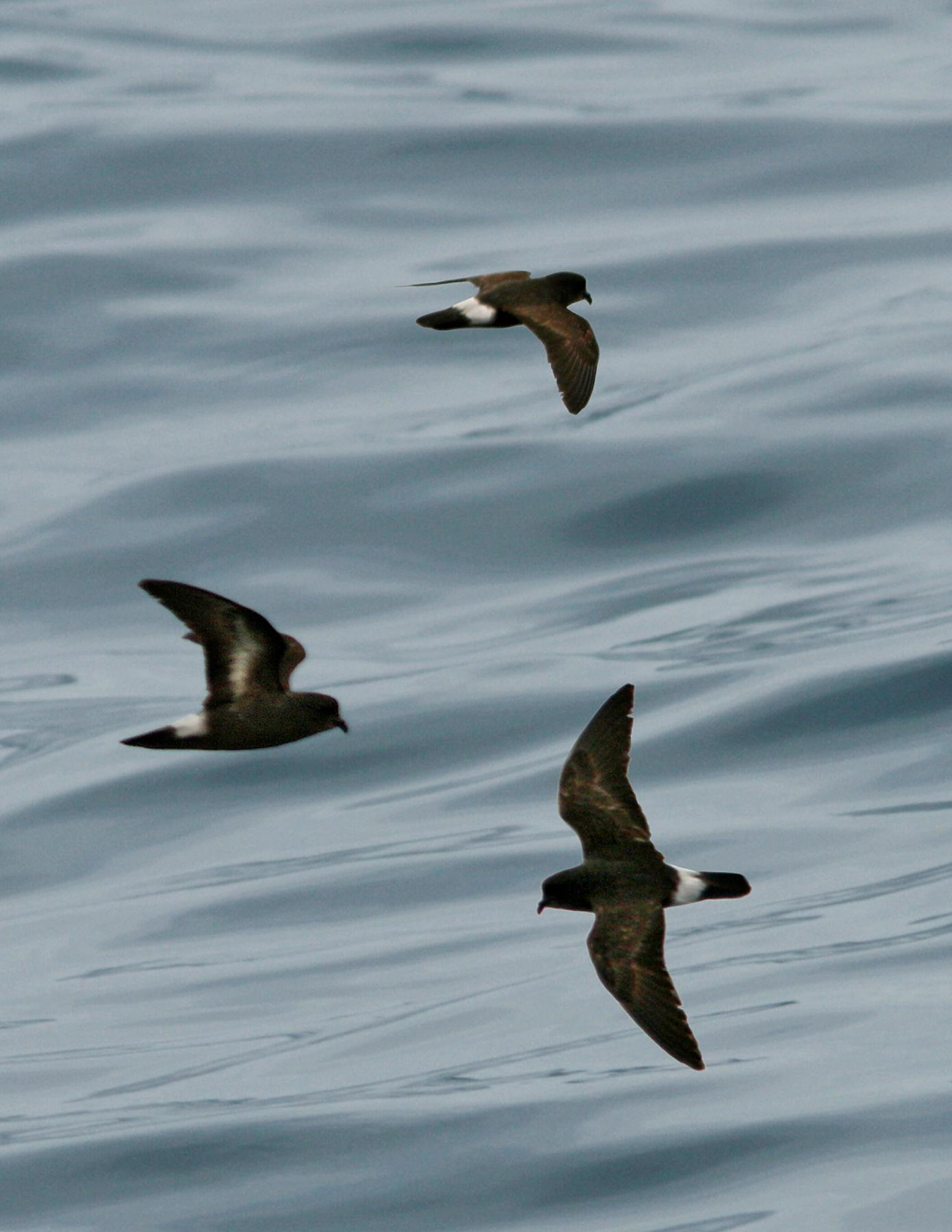
Composite from The Crossley ID Guide

The European storm petrel (Hydrobates pelagicus), also known as British storm petrel, or just storm petrel, is a species of seabird in the northern storm petrel family, Hydrobatidae. The small, square-tailed bird is entirely black except for a broad, white rump and a white band on the under wings, and it has a fluttering, bat-like flight. The large majority of the population breeds on islands off the northern coasts of Europe, with the greatest numbers in the Faroe Islands, United Kingdom, Ireland, and Iceland. The Mediterranean population is a separate subspecies whose strongholds are Filfla Island (Malta), Sicily, and the Balearic Islands. This subspecies is indiscernible at sea from its Atlantic relatives.

The storm petrel nests in crevices and burrows, sometimes shared with other seabirds or rabbits, and lays a single white egg, usually on bare soil. The adults share the lengthy incubation and both feed the chick, which is not normally brooded after the first week. This bird is strongly migratory, spending the Northern Hemisphere winter mainly off the coasts of South Africa and Namibia, with some birds stopping in the seas adjoining West Africa, and a few remaining near their Mediterranean breeding islands. This petrel is strictly oceanic outside the breeding season. It feeds on small fish, squid, and zooplankton, while pattering on the sea's surface, and can find oily, edible items by smell. The food is converted in the bird's stomach to an oily orange liquid, which is regurgitated when the chick is fed. Although usually silent at sea, the storm petrel has a chattering call given by both members of a pair in their courtship flight. The male has a purring song given from the breeding chamber.

The storm petrel cannot survive on islands where land mammals such as rats and cats have been introduced, and it suffers natural predation from gulls, skuas, owls, and falcons. Although the population may be declining slightly, this petrel is classified by the International Union for Conservation of Nature as being of least concern due to its high total numbers. Its presence in rough weather at sea has led to various mariners' superstitions, and by analogy, to its use as a symbol by revolutionary and anarchist groups.

== Taxonomy ==
The northern storm petrels, Hydrobatidae, are one of the four families of the Procellariiformes or "tubenoses", an order of seabirds that also includes the albatrosses in the family Diomedeidae, the petrels and shearwater in the family Procellariidae and the southern storm petrels in the family Oceanitidae. The northern storm petrels are more closely related to members of the family Procellariidae than they are to the southern storm petrels. The European storm petrel was formerly defined as the only member of the genus Hydrobates, the remainder of the Hydrobatinae being placed in Oceanodroma, although the least storm petrel was sometimes separated as the sole member of Halocyptena. Molecular phylogenetic studies found that Oceanodroma was paraphyletic with respect to Hydrobates. As a consequence, in 2021 all members of Oceanodroma were subsumed into an enlarged Hydrobates.

The storm petrel was first described by Carl Linnaeus in his landmark 1758 10th edition of Systema Naturae as Procellaria pelagica. It was moved to the genus Hydrobates by Friedrich Boie in 1822. "Petrel", first recorded in 1602, is a corruption of pitteral, referring to the bird's pitter-pattering across the water. The suggestion that the word refers to St Peter's walking on the waves is a later invention. "Storm" arises from seamen's association of this bird with bad weather. In English, the name of the species was written as "stormy petrel" by some 19th-century authors.

The scientific name hydrobates derives from Greek "hydro-", from hydōr "water", and batēs "walker", and pelagicus from pelagikos "pelagic, of the (open) sea", from pelagos "sea, open sea, high sea". There are two recognised subspecies, the North Atlantic nominate subspecies, H. p. pelagicus (Linnaeus, 1758), and the Mediterranean H. p. melitensis (Schembri, 1843). Although there is some genetic support for classifying the southern form as a separate species, the morphology is not considered sufficiently different from that of the nominate subspecies to justify a split.

== Description ==
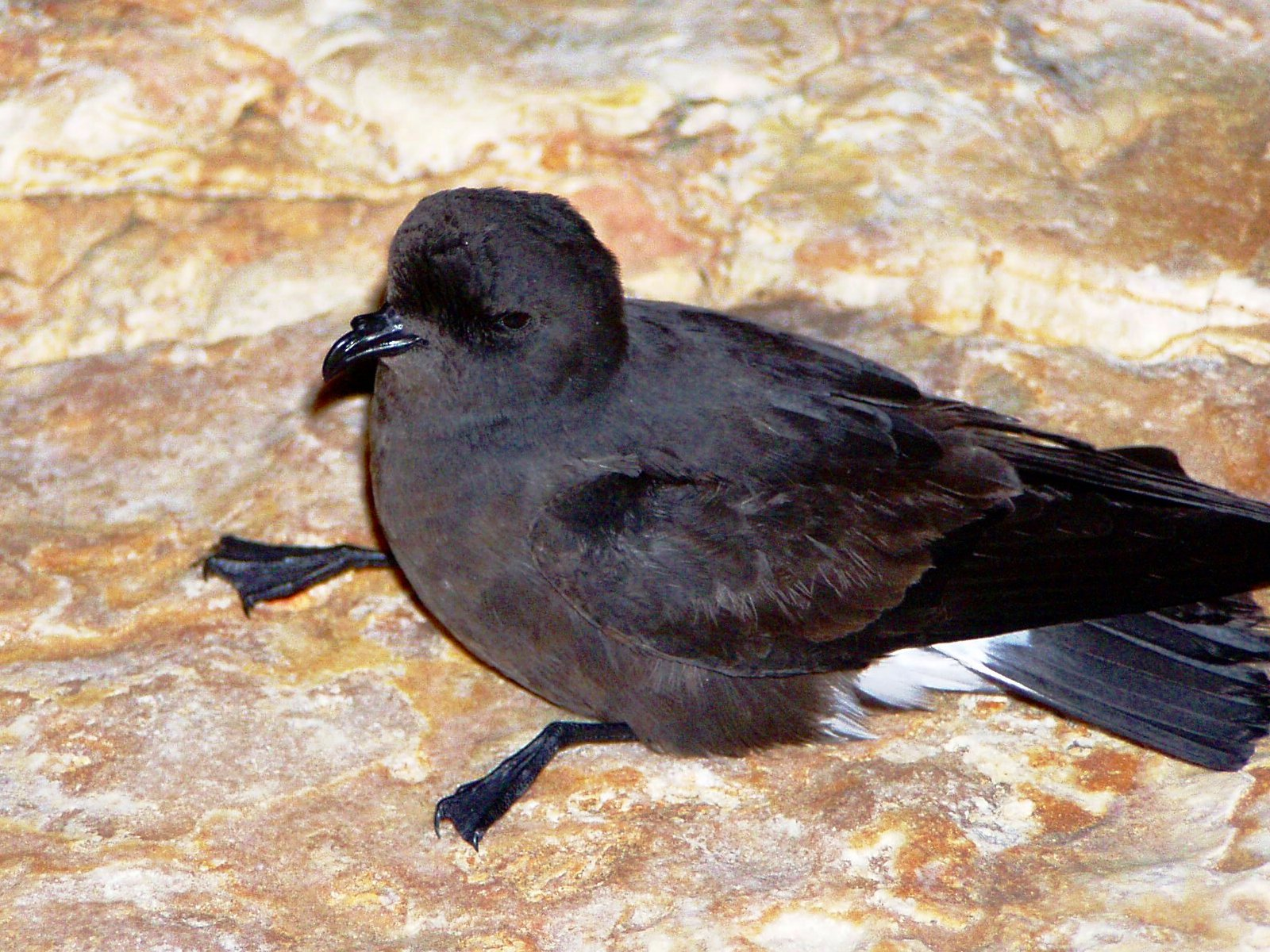
Storm petrels walk only with difficulty on land; they walk on their whole foot including the tarsi.

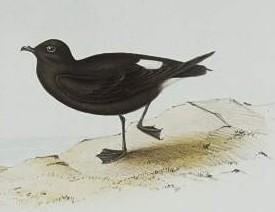
Old illustrations, such as this one by John Gould, were painted from skins, and showed petrels in improbable standing positions.

The storm petrel is a small bird, 14–18 cm (5.5–7.1 in) in length with a 36–39 cm (14–15 in) wingspan. It weighs 20–38 g (0.71–1.34 oz), with an average of 28 g (0.99 oz). It is square-tailed and has all-black plumage except for a snow-white rump that extends to the sides of the tail base and a broad white band on the under wings. Juveniles in fresh plumage can also show a narrow white bar on the upper wing. The plumage becomes dark brown rather than black as it becomes worn. No obvious differences between the sexes are seen, although in the Mediterranean subspecies, at least, most captured birds can be sexed using a formula which involves multiplying the wing length by the length of the white rump band; females are slightly larger and have a longer white rump than males. The Mediterranean subspecies has longer wings and a heavier bill on average than the nominate form, but neither sex nor subspecies can be determined by observation at sea.

Moult is prolonged in all tubenoses, since they must maintain an ability to fly. Northern populations start replacing their plumage after those further south, reflecting the later start to their breeding season. Birds in a Welsh colony commenced moulting in early August, while populations in northern Spain and the Balearics started in early July and mid-June, respectively. Breeding birds moult later than non-breeders.

The storm petrel's large nasal olfactory bulbs facilitate a keen sense of smell (unlike most birds), and the birds have a distinctive musty aroma which can help researchers locate breeding colonies. Individual petrels recognise their own body scent and can use it to locate their nests in the dark.

Their flight is weak-looking and resembles that of a bat, with fluttering interspersed with short glides. When feeding, the birds hang with raised wings and patter on the surface with their feet, but unlike Wilson's storm petrel, do not look as if they are walking on the water. Birds sometimes settle on the sea. Like other petrels but unlike most other birds, the European storm petrel walks only slowly on land, moving on its whole foot (plantigrade) including the tarsi; once there is enough room, the bird flaps its wings to support itself on its toes.

The European storm petrel can be distinguished from related Western Palaearctic species by the white bar on its under wing and its distinctive fluttering flight. Compared to Leach's storm petrel, band-rumped storm petrel, and the recently described Monteiro's storm petrel, it is also smaller, darker, and shorter-winged, and has a square tail. Wilson's storm petrel lacks an under wing bar, and has long legs with the feet visible beyond the tail.

=== Voice ===
In its display flight, the storm petrel gives a call consisting of eight or more repetitions of a fast ter-CHICK sounds ending in a trill (rapid alternation of notes). This chattering, staccato call is highly variable in pitch, stress, and length. Both sexes make the call, which is used as an advertisement for a mate, for pair recognition, and in the nuptial flight. The details of the vocalisation vary geographically, including between the Atlantic and Mediterranean populations, and birds recognise calls from their own breeding area. The chatter-call of the Mediterranean subspecies is distinctive. It has the first two notes running into each other, and the final element is sometimes doubled. The storm petrel is usually silent at sea, but sometimes gives the chattering call. A purring song arrr-r-r-r-r-r-r ... ending with a sharp chikka is given in the burrow only by the male; it was described by Charles Oldham as "like a fairy being sick". Other vocalisations include a fast wick-wick-wick, sometimes given in flight, and an up-CHERRK alarm which resembles the chatter-call. Chicks give a whistling pee-pee-pee call when being fed, and a faster version of this vocalisation is used by adults and young to signal distress.

== Distribution and habitat ==
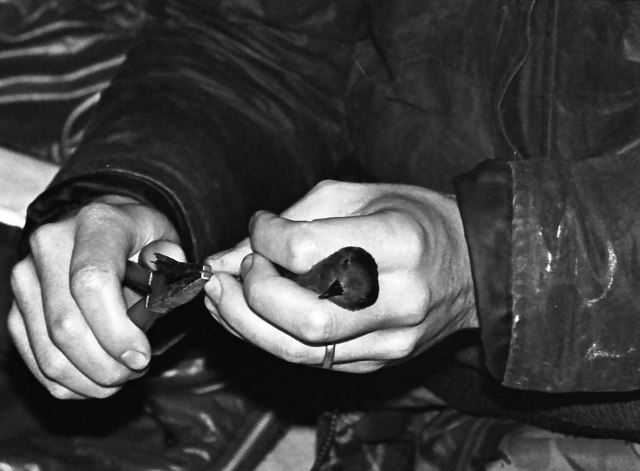
Ringing at Cape Wrath

Storm petrels breed only in the Western Palaearctic on islands off the Atlantic and Mediterranean coasts of Europe. The largest colonies are in the Faroe Islands (150,000–400,000 pairs), United Kingdom (20,000–150,000), Ireland (50,000–100,000), and Iceland (50,000–100,000), with smaller breeding areas off Norway, Malta, Spain, the Canary Islands, Italy, France, and Greece. The strongholds of the H. p. melitensis subspecies are the islands of Filfla (Malta), Sicily, and the Balearic Islands, with smaller sites elsewhere in the Mediterranean. This latter form also breeds in North Africa; definitely in Tunisia, probably in Algeria and possibly in Morocco. Because of its nocturnal habits and the problems of accessing some of the small islands on which it breeds, the distribution is poorly known. A colony was discovered as recently as 2009, on Lampedusa. The storm petrel has been recorded as a vagrant in several European countries as far east as Ukraine, in the Guinea region of West Africa, and in Turkey, Israel, Lebanon, and the US. Although no North American records were reported for more than 30 years after the first in 1970, this bird has been more or less annual in small numbers since 2003.

The storm petrel breeds on exposed and usually uninhabited islands, which it visits only at night. It otherwise frequents mid-depth waters away from the coastal zone, but not over the ocean deeps. In the breeding season, it is mainly found between the 10–25 °C July isotherms. In Europe, it is rarely seen from land except in autumn storms.

The storm petrel is migratory, spending the Northern Hemisphere winter mainly in cool waters off the coasts of South Africa and Namibia, south to latitude 38°S and east to KwaZulu-Natal. Some birds stay north of the equator in the seas adjoining Mauritania and Rio de Oro, and a few remain near the breeding islands, especially in the Mediterranean. It is strictly oceanic outside the breeding season, although it is described as regularly seen from land in West Africa. Young birds do not return to the breeding colonies until their second or third year. Birds mostly head south from the breeding islands between September and November, reaching West Africa by mid-November and the south Atlantic by the end of the year. The return passage starts in April, with late records from the tropics and further south probably representing subadult birds that will not breed that year.

== Behaviour ==
=== Breeding ===
The storm petrel is sexually mature at age 4–5 years, with the Mediterranean subspecies typically breeding a year earlier than the Atlantic form. Breeding happens in colonies and normally begins in late May or June. Pairs have a repeated nocturnal display flight in which the male chases the female, the chase being accompanied by flight calls. Some near-adult birds may pair up and occupy a hole at the same time, prior to breeding in the following year.

Storm petrels normally nest in crevices between or under rocks, or burrow in the soil. When they make their own tunnels, they loosen the earth with their bills and kick out the debris with their feet. The birds less commonly nest in walls, under buildings, or down rabbit burrows. Disused or occupied burrows of Atlantic puffins and Manx shearwaters are sometimes used, and the petrel pair may share a common entrance with those seabirds, rabbits, or other pairs of its own species. Where other occupants are present, the petrels dig a side burrow or use an existing low-roofed tunnel which the larger birds or rabbits cannot easily enter. Even so, puffins and shearwaters sometimes access and destroy nests, and adult petrels may be killed by their larger neighbours. Human-made plastic nesting tubes are readily used, and may provide protection against predators. Birds usually mate for life and use the same hole every year.

The nest tunnel is 10–300 cm (3.9–118.1 in) long and 5–8 cm (2.0–3.1 in) across, with a slightly narrower entrance. The nest chamber is typically unlined, although pairs may bring in some grass, bracken, or seaweed. Although the storm petrel is generally not territorial when breeding, a pair defends the nest chamber itself after the eggs have been laid.

The clutch is a single egg, usually pure white, sometimes with some reddish-brown spots that soon disappear. The average size of the egg is 28 mm × 21 mm (1.10 in × 0.83 in), and it weighs 6.8 g (0.24 oz), of which 6% is shell. If an egg is lost early enough, a replacement may be laid on rare occasions. This is very unusual for tubenoses. The eggs are incubated by both parents for 38–50 days, the longer periods arising when the eggs have become chilled through adult absence. One adult typically spends three days at a time on the egg while its partner feeds at sea. The chicks are altricial and covered with silver-grey down, and are fed by both parents with their regurgitated oily stomach contents. The adults do not normally stay with the chick after the first week, visiting only to bring food. After about 50 days, the chicks are fed less regularly, sometimes with gaps of several days, and the parents may stop visiting completely shortly before the chick leaves the nest. The chicks fledge about 56–86 days after hatching, and receive no parental support after leaving the nest hole.

Tubenoses have smaller egg clutches and much longer and more variable incubation and fledging times than passerines with similarly sized eggs, resembling swifts in these developmental factors. Tubenoses and swifts have generally secure nest sites, but their food sources are unreliable, whereas passerines are vulnerable in the nest but food is usually plentiful. In the particular case of the storm petrel, it has a body temperature perhaps 3 °C lower than other small birds, and this may also contribute to the lengthy incubation.

The adult petrel's annual death rate is 12–13%, and the typical life span is 11 years. Longevity records established from bird ringing recoveries include a bird aged 31 years 11 months 9 days, and another aged more than 33 years.

=== Feeding ===
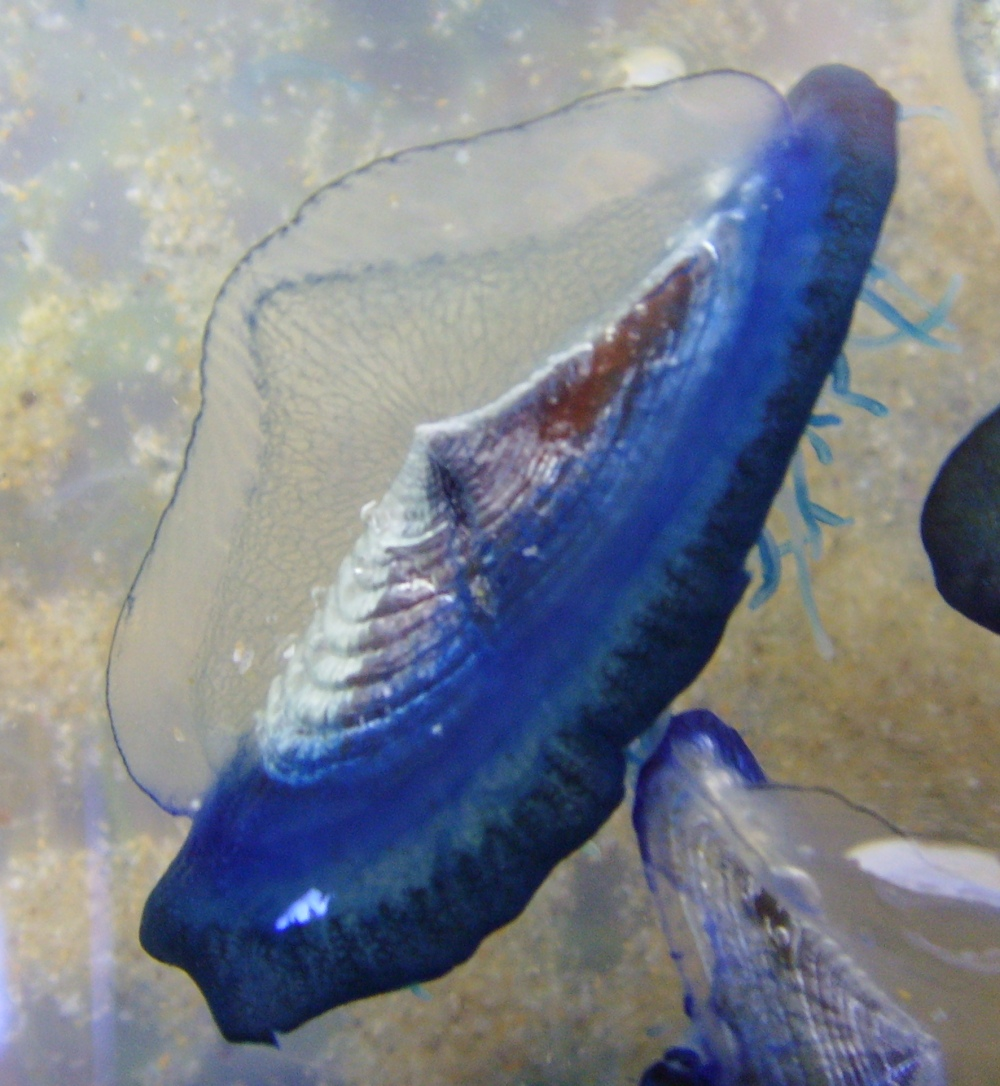
The by-the-wind sailor is a small jellyfish eaten by storm petrels.

The storm petrel normally flies within 10 m (33 ft) of the water surface and typically feeds by picking items off the sea as it patters over the surface. Birds have been observed diving for food to a depth of not more than 0.5 m (20 in). and it is claimed, using indirect measurements, that the Mediterranean subspecies reaches depths of up to 5 m (16 ft)). A bird may range up to 200 km (120 mi) over the course of two or three days in search of food. Although the bird usually feeds during the day, in the breeding season petrels will often feed at night close to the shore.

The typical prey consists of surface organisms such as small fish, squid, crustaceans and jellyfish. The storm petrel will also eat offal and oily food, often located by smell, and will follow ships. In the Atlantic, more than half the food items are zooplankton and the fish caught include small herring and sprats; whale carcasses are scavenged where available. During digestion, the plankton is quickly converted to an oily orange liquid that owes its colour to carotenoids. Larger prey items take longer to digest. The oil, rich in vitamin A, is produced by a large gland in the stomach. The Mediterranean subspecies' diet is mainly fish, particularly Mediterranean sand eels. Petrels also catch opossum shrimps from waters close to the colony. Bluefin tuna farms are exploited on the Maltese island of Filfla; birds from the large local colony feed on the unwashed food fed to the farmed tuna, a mixture of fish, squid and prawns which produces a sizeable oily slick. Small numbers of insects are caught near breeding colonies, and some plant material, including angiosperm seeds and sorrel, has been found in the stomach contents. A study on Leach's storm petrel, which consumes similar items, showed that the petrels were snipping pieces off plant leaves in flight, but it could not be confirmed that this was in the course of catching insects. Nasal glands remove excess salt from seawater consumed by the petrel as a concentrated solution excreted through the nostrils.

Petrels can be attracted to boats with "chum", a malodorous mixture typically containing fish heads, bones and offal, with added fish oil and popcorn to aid flotation. An apparently empty ocean will soon fill with hundreds of birds attracted by the smell. The attraction of the fishy odour is sometimes enhanced by the addition of dimethylsulphide (DMS) a chemical also naturally produced by some planktonic organisms, although there are doubts about the safety of this possible carcinogen.

European storm-petrels regularly feed nocturnally, mostly in in-shore waters and near the edge of the continental shelf. At the shelf, they specifically prefer dark, cloudy nights, possibly because some vertically migratory plankton prey tend to move closer to the surface in low light conditions. This behavior makes them the only seabird other than swallow-tailed gull known to prefer to feed on dark nights.

== Predators and parasites ==
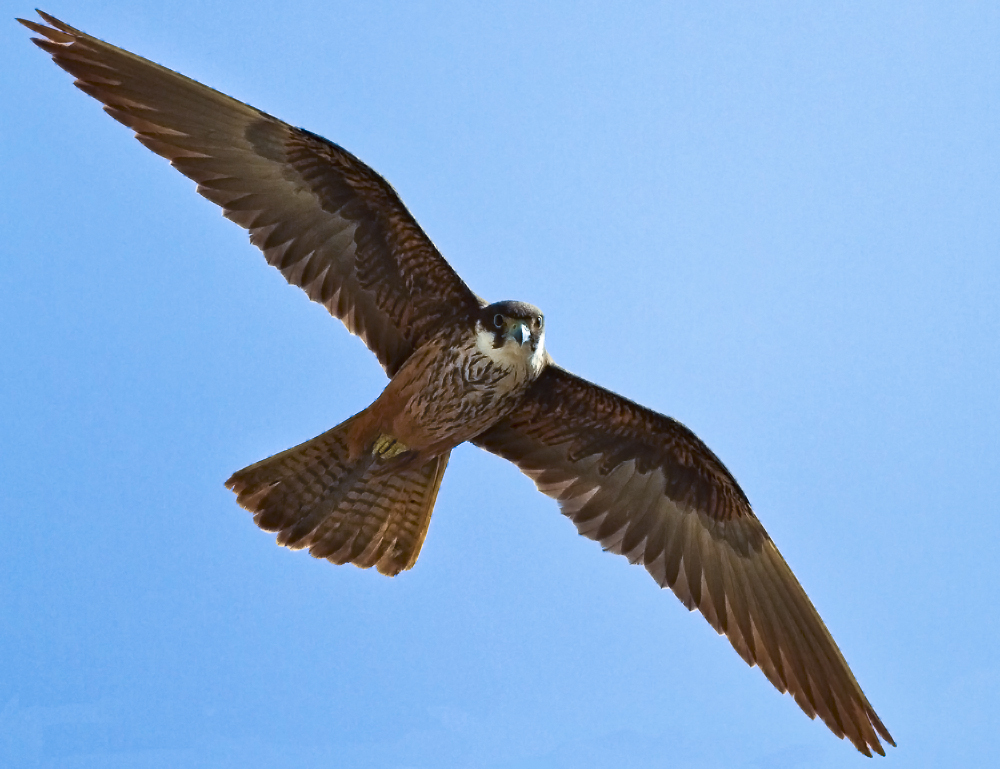
Eleonora's falcon is a local predator on some Mediterranean islands.

Adults and young are vulnerable to predation at the breeding colonies, their only defence being to spit oil. Petrels cannot breed on islands where rats have been introduced, and feral cats frequently kill these birds on Foula in the Shetland Islands. The American mink, a non-native species in Europe, is a strong swimmer, and can colonise islands up to 2 km (2,200 yd) from the mainland. Natural predators of petrels and other seabirds include skuas and large gulls. The yellow-legged gull is a particular problem in the Mediterranean, and great skuas were estimated to kill 7,500 petrels a year on St Kilda, an unsustainable number. Some great black-backed gulls on the Atlantic islands specialise in taking seabird chicks at night, and peregrine falcons hunt adults at sea. Localised predators include Eleonora's falcon on the Columbretes Islands and the nocturnal barn owl on the Balearics; a few owls can wipe out a colony. The little owl is also a predator of both adults and young where it occurs.

Feather mites of at least two species have been found on the storm petrel, with Halipeurus pelagicus occurring at much higher densities than Philoceanus robertsi. The flea Xenopsylla gratiosa and dermanyssid mites are commonly found, with lower numbers of ticks. These blood-sucking parasites slow the growth rate of nestlings and may affect their survival rate.

Storm petrels seem to be largely free of blood parasites, even when in close proximity to carrier species such as the yellow-legged gull. It has been suggested that seabird species with long incubation periods and long lives have well-developed immune systems that prevent serious blood parasitism.

== Status ==
The European population of the storm petrel has been estimated at 430,000–510,000 breeding pairs or 1,290,000–1,530,000 individual birds and makes up 95% of the world total numbers. The population estimate includes 11,000 to 16,000 breeding pairs of the Mediterranean subspecies. It is very difficult to accurately determine storm petrel populations. The main method used is listening for responses to playback calls at burrow entrances, but infra-red filming may also be an option.

Although this species' population now appears to be declining, the decrease is not rapid or large enough to trigger conservation vulnerability criteria. Given its high numbers, this petrel is therefore classified by the International Union for Conservation of Nature as being of least concern. The perceived decline may be due increased predation from gulls, skuas and introduced mammals. Eradication of rats protects seabird colonies and may enable recolonisation of islands cleared of rodents. Predation of cave-nesting petrels in the Balearics by yellow-legged gulls is restricted to relatively few individual gulls specialising in this prey item; this means the problems can be controlled by selective culling and the provision of plastic nest boxes.

Because it feeds in flight, the storm petrel is less affected by oil pollution than other seabirds, and may be able to use its good sense of smell to avoid slicks, although a large spill near a breeding colony could have serious consequences.

== In culture ==
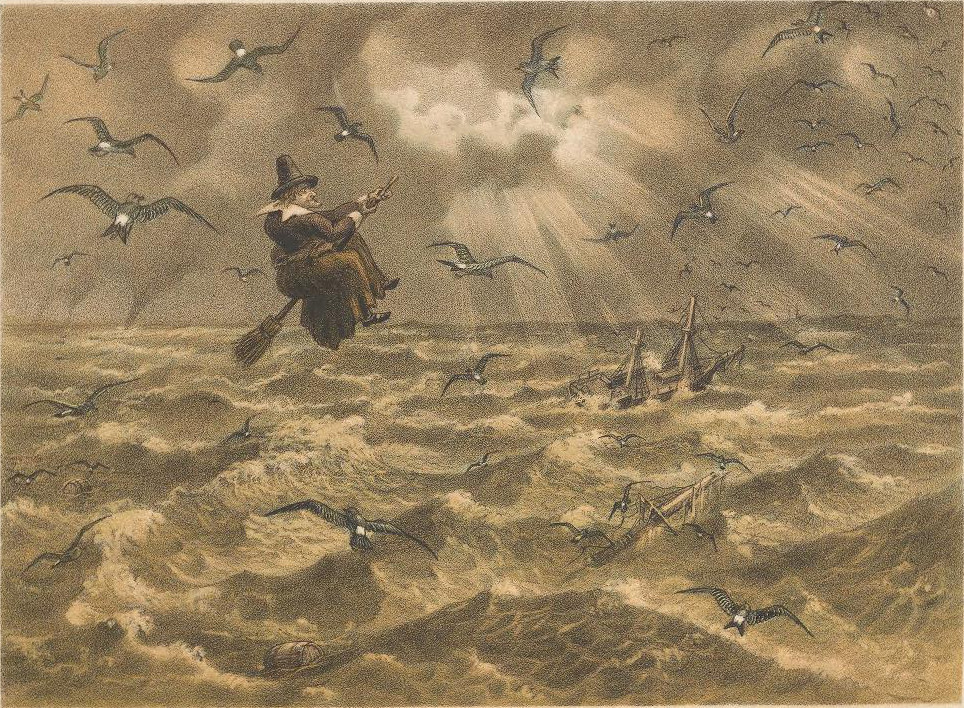
"Mother Carey and her chickens". Lithograph by J. G. Keulemans, 1877.

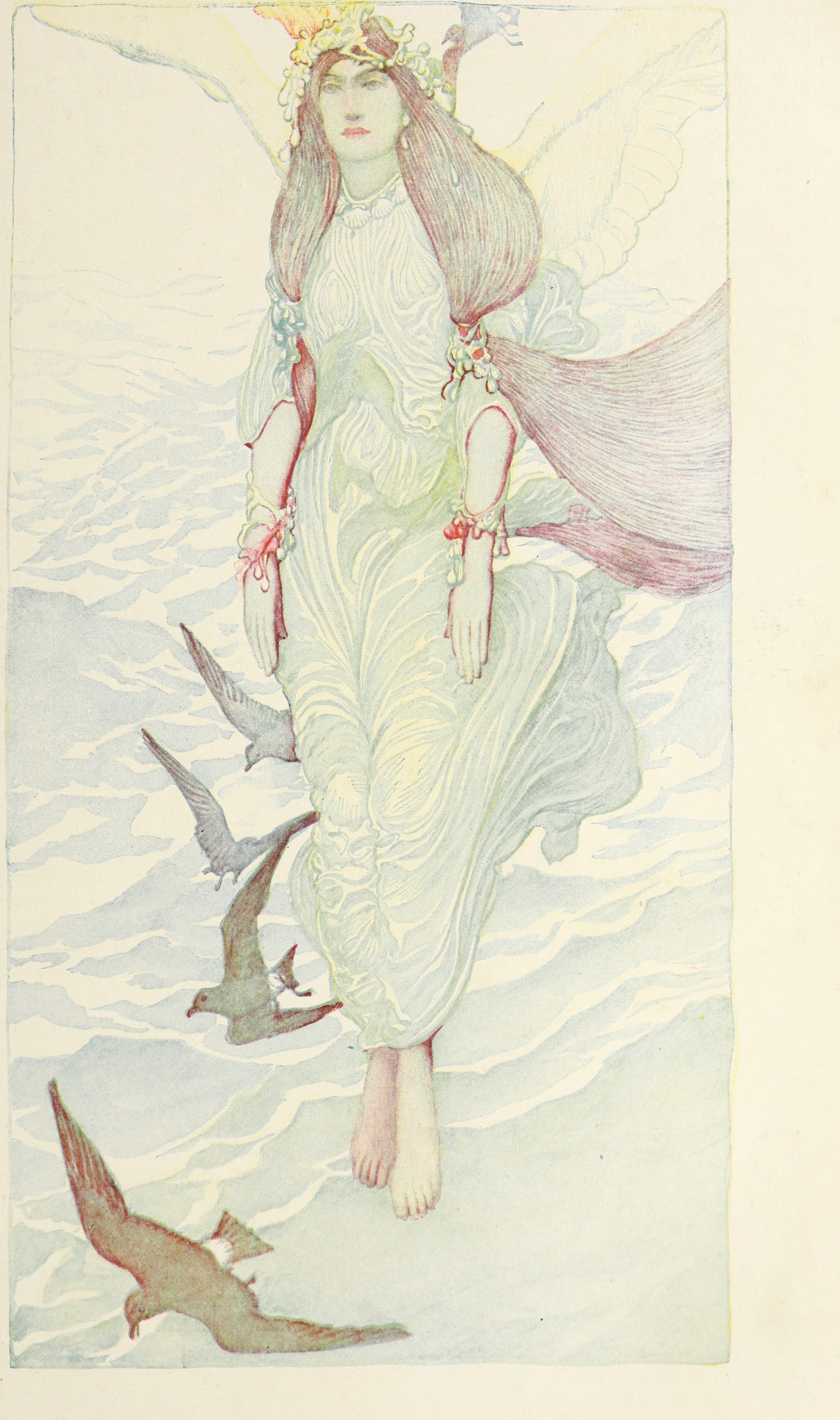
Mother Carey. Illustration by Howard Pyle, 1902.

Its association with storms makes the storm petrel a bird of bad omen to mariners; they are said to either foretell or cause bad weather. A more prosaic explanation of their appearance in rough weather is that, like most oceanic seabirds, they rely on the winds to support them in flight and just sit on the water surface when becalmed. The birds were sometimes thought to be the souls of perished sailors, and killing a petrel was believed to bring bad luck. The petrel's reputation led to the old name of witch, although the commonest of the folk names is Mother Carey's chicken, a name also used for storm petrels in general in the UK and North America from at least 1767. This is believed to be a corruption of mater cara (dear mother, the Virgin Mary), a reference to the supernatural Mother Carey, or a superstitious modification of an earlier Mother Mary's chicken to reduce the potency of the religious name. The Mother Carey character appears a number of times in literature. In the Cicely Fox Smith poem "Mother Carey", she calls old sailors to return to the sea, but in John Masefield's poem of the same name she is seen as a wrecker of ships. She appears as a fairy in Charles Kingsley's The Water Babies and is depicted in one of Jessie Willcox Smith's illustrations for the book.

The association of the storm petrel with turbulent weather has led to its use as a metaphor for revolutionary views, the epithet "stormy petrel" being applied by various authors to characters as disparate as Roman tribune Publius Clodius Pulcher, a Presbyterian minister in the early Carolinas, an Afghan governor, or an Arkansas politician. A 1901 poem by Russian writer Maxim Gorky is invariably titled in English as "The Song of the Stormy Petrel", although that may not be a perfectly accurate translation of the Russian title "Песня о Буревестнике", because "Буревестник" (the name of the bird in Russian) translates to the English general term "storm bird". (Note: The 1903 edition of Vladimir Dal's Explanatory Dictionary of the Living Great Russian Language, defined burevestnik (the name of the bird actually used by Gorky) or "bird of storm" as a generic name for the Procellariidae, and illustrated it with several examples, including the species known in English as the wandering albatross, southern giant petrel, northern fulmar and the European storm petrel. The Russian name for the European storm petrel, according to the same dictionary, is kachurka, rather than an adjective phrase with burevestnik. This is a modern reprint (using modernized Russian orthography) of the 1903 edition that would have been familiar to Gorky and his readers.) The poem was called "the battle anthem of the revolution", and earned Gorky the nickname "The Storm Petrel of the Revolution".

Various revolutionary anarchist groups adopted the bird's name, either as a group identifier, as in the Spanish Civil War, or for their publications. The Stormy Petrel (Burevestnik) was the title of the magazine of the Anarchist Communist Federation in Russia around the time of the 1905 revolution, and is still an imprint of the London group of the Anarchist Federation. To honour Gorky and his work, the name Burevestnik was bestowed on a variety of institutions, locations, and products in the USSR.

In the film Pirates of the Caribbean: Dead Man's Chest, the bursar of the Edinburgh Trader (played by Max Baker) makes a reference to Mother Carey's chickens, moments before the Kraken attacks the ship.

== Cited texts ==
- Abbott, Frank Frost (1909). Society and Politics in Ancient Rome: Essays and Sketch. New York: Biblo & Tannen Publishers.
- Barlow, Clive; Wacher, Tim; Disley, Tony (1997). A Field Guide to birds of The Gambia and Senegal. Bexhill-on-Sea, Sussex: Pica Press. ISBN 978-1-873403-32-7.
- Blomdahl, Anders; Breife, Bertil; Holmstrom, Niklas (2007). Flight Identification of European Seabirds. London: Christopher Helm. ISBN 978-0-7136-8616-6.
- Christie, Stuart (2005). We, the Anarchists!: A Study of the Iberian Anarchist Federation (FAI) 1927–1937. Hastings, Sussex: Meltzer Press. ISBN 978-1-901172-06-5.
- Cocker, Mark; Mabey, Richard (2005). Birds Britannica. London: Chatto & Windus. ISBN 978-0-7011-6907-7.
- Coward, Thomas Alfred (1929). The Birds of the British Isles and Their Eggs. Vol. 2 (fourth ed.). London: Frederick Warne.
- Cramp, Stanley, ed. (1977). Handbook of the Birds of Europe, the Middle East and North Africa: the birds of the Western Palearctic. Vol. 1. Ostrich to Ducks. Oxford: Oxford University Press. ISBN 978-0-19-857358-6.
- van Duivendijk, Nils (2011). Advanced Bird ID Handbook: The Western Palearctic. London: New Holland. ISBN 978-1-78009-022-1.
- Enticott, Jim; Tipling, David (2002). Seabirds of the World. London: New Holland. ISBN 978-1-84330-327-5.
- Eyers, Jonathan (2011). Don't Shoot the Albatross!: Nautical Myths and Superstitions. London: A & C Black. ISBN 978-1-4081-3131-2.
- Fisher, James; Lockley, R.M. (1989). Sea‑Birds. Collins New Naturalist series. London: Bloomsbury Books. ISBN 978-1-870630-88-7.
- Fox Smith, Cicely (1919). Songs & Chanties: 1914–1916. London: Elkin Mathews.
- Grey, C. (1929). Garrett, Herbert Leonard Offley (ed.). European Adventurers of Northern India, 1785 to 1849. Delhi: Atlantic Publishers.
- Howell, Steve N.G. (2012). Petrels, Albatrosses, and Storm-Petrels of North America: A Photographic Guide. Princeton, New Jersey: Princeton University Press. ISBN 978-0-691-14211-1.
- Hume, Rob; Pearson, Bruce (1993). Seabirds. London: Hamlyn. ISBN 978-0-600-57951-9.
- Hume, Rob (2011). RSPB Birds of Britain and Europe (3rd ed.). Harlow, Essex: Dorling Kindersley. ISBN 978-1-4053-6202-3.
- Jacobson, Charles; Davis, Jeff (1925). The life story of Jeff Davis: the stormy petrel of Arkansas politics. New York: Parke-Harper.
- Jobling, James A. (2010). The Helm Dictionary of Scientific Bird Names. London: Christopher Helm. ISBN 978-1-4081-2501-4.
- Karleskint, George; Turner, Richard L.; Small, James W. (2013). Introduction to Marine Biology (4th ed.). Belmont, California: Wadsworth. ISBN 978-1-133-36446-7.
- Kingsley, Charles (1863). The Water-Babies. London: Macmillan.
- Linnaeus, Carl (1758). Systema naturae per regna tria naturae, secundum classes, ordines, genera, species, cum characteribus, differentiis, synonymis, locis. Tomus I. Editio decima, reformata (in Latin). Holmiae [Stockholm]: Laurentii Salvii.
- Lockwood, William Burley (1984). Oxford Book of British Bird Names. Oxford: Oxford University Press. ISBN 978-0-19-214155-2.
- Lynah, Mary-Elizabeth (1934). Archibald Stobo of Carolina: Presbyterianism's Stormy-petrel. Washington: American Historical Society.
- Mante, Alain; Debize, Elodie (2012). Mediterranean storm petrel Hydrobates pelagicus melitensis, Updated state of knowledge & conservation of the nesting populations of the Mediterranean Small Island (PDF). Aix en Provence, Bouches-du-Rhône: Initiative pour les Petites Iles de Méditerranée (Initiative PIM). Archived from the original (PDF) on 5 October 2013.
- Masefield, John (1902). Salt Water Ballads. London: Grant Richards.
- Mironov, Boris Nikolaevich (2012). The Standard of Living and Revolutions in Imperial Russia, 1700–1917. London: Routledge. ISBN 978-0-415-60854-1.
- Mullarney, Killian; Svensson, Lars; Zetterström, Dan; Grant, Peter J. (2009). Collins Bird Guide (2nd ed.). London: Collins. ISBN 978-0-00-726726-2.
- Parkin, David; Knox, Alan (2010). The Status of Birds in Britain and Ireland. London: A & C Black. ISBN 978-1-4081-2500-7.
- Sinclair, Ian; Hockey, Phil; Tarboton, Warwick (2002). SASOL Birds of Southern Africa. Cape Town: Struik. ISBN 978-1-86872-721-6.
- Snow, David; Perrins, Christopher M., eds. (1998). The Birds of the Western Palearctic concise edition (2 volumes). Oxford: Oxford University Press. ISBN 978-0-19-854099-1.
- Soper, Tony; Powell, Dan (2008). Wildlife of the North Atlantic: A Cruising Guide. Chalfont St. Peter, Buckinghamshire: Bradt Travel Guides. ISBN 978-1-84162-258-3.
- Yaroslansky, E. (1937). History of Anarchism in Russia. New York: International Publishers of New York.
- Ziolkowski, Margaret (1998). Literary Exorcisms of Stalinism: Russian Writers and the Soviet Past. London: Camden House. ISBN 978-1-57113-179-9.
