= Philoceanus robertsi =

Scientific classification
- Kingdom: Animalia
- Phylum: Arthropoda
- Class: Insecta
- Order: Psocodea
- Infraorder: Phthiraptera
- Family: Philopteridae
- Genus: Philoceanus
- Species: P. robertsi

Binomial name
- Philoceanus robertsi (Clay, 1940)

Species of louse

Philoceanus robertsi is a species of phtilopterid louse found on seabirds including European storm petrel and Wilson's storm petrel.
