= Henry Bullock =

English priest and academic (d.1526)

Henry Bullock (died 1526) was an English clergyman, academic and humanist, a friend of Erasmus and a correspondent of his in the period 1516 to 1518.

== Life ==
He was from the diocese of Lichfield and Coventry, and was educated at the University of Cambridge. He took his degree of B.A. in 1503 or 1504, was admitted fellow of Queens' College, Cambridge in 1506, M.A. in 1507, and D.D. in 1520. In 1524-5 he held the office of vice-chancellor of the university.

He delivered a course of lectures on mathematics, for which he received a salary from the university, but subsequently he devoted himself to the study of Greek, and gave lectures on the gospel of Matthew. He was an intimate friend of Erasmus, and letters which passed between them are to be found in the printed editions of Erasmus's letters. His foreign friends Latinised his name, calling him 'Bovillus.'

His health was poor and he complained of the loss of an eye that hindered his work. He took holy orders, and was rector of St. Martin's Ludgate from 1522 or 1523 till his death, which happened before 4 July 1526, when Thomas Lupset succeeded him. His library was purchased by Queens' College after his death.

== Works ==
He wrote the following books:

- 'Contra Lutherum de Captivitate Babylonica,' written at the desire of Cardinal Wolsey, whose chaplain he was.
- 'Orationes et epistolae.'
- 'Oratio habita Cantabrigiae in frequentissimo coetu, praesentibus Caesaris oratoribus et nonnullis aliis episcopis, ad Card. Wolssaeum.' This was dedicated to John Talerus, and printed by John Siberch in 1521.
- 'Lepidissimum Luciani opusculum περὶ δυψάδων (de siticulosis serpentibus) Henrico Bulloco interprete.' A translation from Lucian.
