= John Siberch =

English printer (c.1476–1554)

John Siberch (c. 1476–1554) was the first Cambridge printer and an associate of Erasmus.

== Life ==
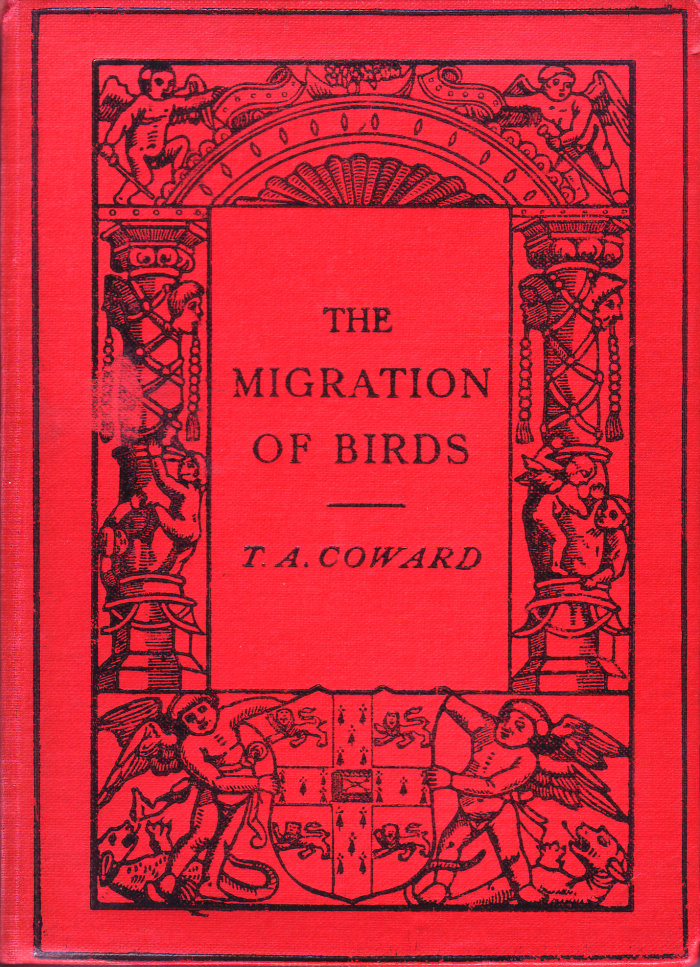
Aside from the coat-of-arms and lettering, the design of covers and title pages of early 20th-century Cambridge Press publications, like this cover of The Migration of Birds (1912) by Thomas Coward, is that used by Siberch in 1521

=== Early life ===
Johann Lair was born about 1476 to Peter (a master wool weaver and town councillor) and Lena von Lair. The family moved from Sieglar (Lair), to nearby Siegburg, during his childhood and he adopted the name of this town when he enrolled at the University of Cologne as Johann de Syberch, on 5 December 1492.

=== Early career ===
Siberch became involved in the book trade in the 1510s, initially as a travelling salesman for the bookseller Hans Beck of Cologne. He married a daughter, whose given name is unknown, of the bookseller Gerhard Amersfoort. The couple had two daughters, Katharina and Baetzgen. His wife's sister Gertrud was married to the bookseller Franz Birckmann of Cologne, a major importer of books to Germany, France, the Netherlands and England with establishments in Paris, Antwerp and London. Another sister, Anna, was the second wife of the printer Servaes van Sassen of Louvain.

Siberch thus had familial links with some of the key figures in North European printing and bookselling. Through them in turn he formed connections with the leading humanist scholars, including Erasmus.

In 1520 he commissioned the Cologne printer Eucharius Cervicornus to print a Greek grammar by Richard Croke, recently appointed to a lectureship in Greek at the University of Cambridge. It is thought that it was Croke who persuaded Siberch to move to Cambridge and set up a printing press.

=== His time at Cambridge ===
In the year to Michaelmas 1521 the university records a loan of £20 to Siberch, the four guarantors including Henry Bullock, fellow of Queens' College and subsequently vice-chancellor of the university. Assisted by this loan, Siberch set up his business as a bookseller, binder and printer in a tenement known as the King's Arms on the site of what is now Tree Court of Gonville & Caius College. There is no record of Siberch repaying the loan, however the original sum was repaid and the interest waived by Cambridge University in 1971 on the 450th anniversary of the printing of the first book in Cambridge.

Siberch's known printed output is small (see Works below). However, the authors, translators and dedicatees comprise many of the major contemporary figures of church, state and academia, including bishops John Fisher of Rochester and Nicholas West of Ely, Richard Pace, Secretary of State to Henry VIII, the royal physician Thomas Linacre and, above all, the great humanist scholar Desiderius Erasmus and his circle, while the books touch upon significant issues of the day, such as religious reform and the new humanist learning. In addition to academic works, perhaps in an attempt to boost his income, Siberch printed more popular titles, including a Latin grammar for schools, poetry and an almanac. He also did jobbing printing: two single sheet documents for religious houses are known. A small number of stamped leather bindings by Siberch also survive, some bearing his initials.

Siberch's Cambridge venture was short-lived and not, apparently, a great success. His wife died in England and there is no record of him in the city after 1523.

=== Later life ===
Siberch may have spent time in Cologne. He visited Siegburg in 1526 and had taken holy orders by 1538. His daughter Baetzgen married an Englishman and records suggest that Siberch returned to England and served as a priest in the parish of St Olave, Southwark, approximately from 1529 to 1540. He had settled once again in Siegburg by 1544, where he served as a priest in the parish church of St Servatius in whose churchyard he was presumably buried following his death shortly before 28 September 1554.

== Works ==
Items printed in Cambridge by Siberch:

- Doctissimi viri Henrici Bulloci ... oratio habita Cātabrigiae ... ad reverendiss. D. Thomā Cardinalem ... (1521) [speech of welcome by Henry Bullock addressed to Cardinal Wolsey on the occasion of his visit to the city in autumn 1520]
- Cuiusdā fidelis Christiani epistola, ad Christianos oēs ..., subsequitur & divi Augustini de miseria, ac brevitate huius mortalis vitae, sermo ... (1521) [anonymous letter by a Christian to all Christians, followed by a sermon by Augustine of Hippo on the misery and brevity of human life]
- Lepidissimum Luciani opusculū περὶ διψὰδων, Henrico Bulloco interprete, Oratio eiusdem ... (1521) [rhetorical exercise by Lucian on the dipsades, poisonous snakes of the Libyan desert, translated from the Greek by Bullock, with a reprint of the latter's speech to Wolsey]
- Reverendissimi ... Balduini ... de venerabili ac divinissimo altaris sacramento sermo ... (1521) [sermon by Baldwin of Forde, a twelfth-century archbishop of Canterbury, on the holy sacrament]
- Libellus de conscribendis epistolis, auctore D. Erasmo ... (1521) [manual on letter-writing by Erasmus]
- Galeni Pergamensis de temperamentis, et de inaequali intemperie libri tres Thoma Linacro interprete (1521) [translation from the Greek by Thomas Linacre of two medical tracts by Galen]
- Contio quam Anglice habuit ... Ioannes Roffensis episcopus ... eo die, quo Martini Lutheri scripta ... in ignem coniecta sunt, versa in Latinum per Richardum Pacaeum ... (1522) [Latin translation by Richard Pace of speech delivered in English by John Fisher, bishop of Rochester, on the occasion of the burning in London of the books of Martin Luther]
- Papyrii Gemini Eleatis Hermathena, seu De Eloquentia victoria (1522) [pseudonymous humanist allegory attributed to, amongst others, Sir Thomas Elyot and Richard Croke]
- [De octo partium orationis constructione libellus, by William Lily and Erasmus ([1523?])] [fragment of a Latin grammar, found in the binding of a book in the library of Westminster Abbey]
- [First eclogue, by Alexander Barclay ([1523?]) [four fragments found in the binding of other books]
- [Almanac for the year 1524 ([1523?])] [fragment found in the binding of a book in the library of Ushaw College]
- [Indulgence for the Benedictine Nunnery of St Michael Without, Stamford ([1523?])] [fragment found in the binding of a book in the Bodleian Library]
- [Letter of fraternity for an unknown religious house ([1523?])] [fragments of two settings of the same text found in the binding of a book in the library of King Edward VI School Bury and now in Cambridge University Library]

Siberch is not known to have printed anything before or after his time in Cambridge.
