= Henry Alexander Miers =

British mineralogist and academic (1858–1942)

Professor Sir Henry Alexander Miers Kt FRS
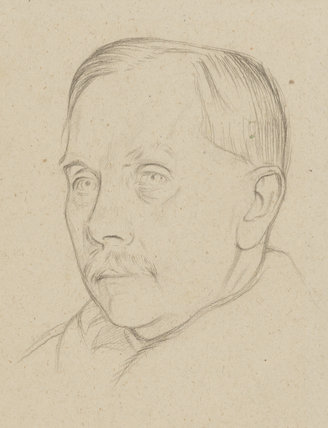
- Pencil drawing of Miers by William Rothenstein, 1917
- Born: 25 May 1858; Rio de Janeiro, Brazil
- Died: 10 December 1942 (aged 84)
- Education: Eton College; Trinity College, Oxford
- Occupations: Mineralogist; Crystallographer

Sir Henry Alexander Miers, FRS (25 May 1858 – 10 December 1942) was a British mineralogist and crystallographer.

Born in Rio de Janeiro, Brazil, he was educated at Eton College and Trinity College, Oxford. He was elected a Fellow of the Royal Society in 1896. He was elected to membership of the Manchester Literary and Philosophical Society on 30 November 1915 and was President of the Society 1919–21.

He was Professor of Crystallography at the Victoria University of Manchester 1915–1926 and Vice-Chancellor of the University during the same years.

== Selected publications ==
- with R. Crosskey: The soil in relation to health. Macmillan. 1893.
- Individuality in the mineral kingdom, an inaugural lecture delivered at the university museum, Oxford, on May 20, 1896, by Henry A. Miers. B.H. Blackwell. 23 February 1896.
- Miers, Sir Henry Alexander (1901). Yukon : a visit to the Yukon gold-fields : letter by Henry Alex Miers. CIHM/ICMH Microfiche series;no. 72898. ISBN 978-0-665-72898-3.
- Mineralogy; an introduction to the scientific study of minerals. Macmillan and Co., limited. 1902.
- The growth of a crystal : being the eighteenth Robert Boyle lecture delivered before the Oxford University Junior Scientific Club, on the 20th of May, 1911. Journal of the Oxford University Junior Scientific Club; June, 1911. Henry Frowde. 23 February 2024.

Professional and academic associations
Preceded by Sir Grafton Elliot Smith	President of the Manchester Literary and Philosophical Society; 1919–21	Succeeded by Thomas Alfred Coward
