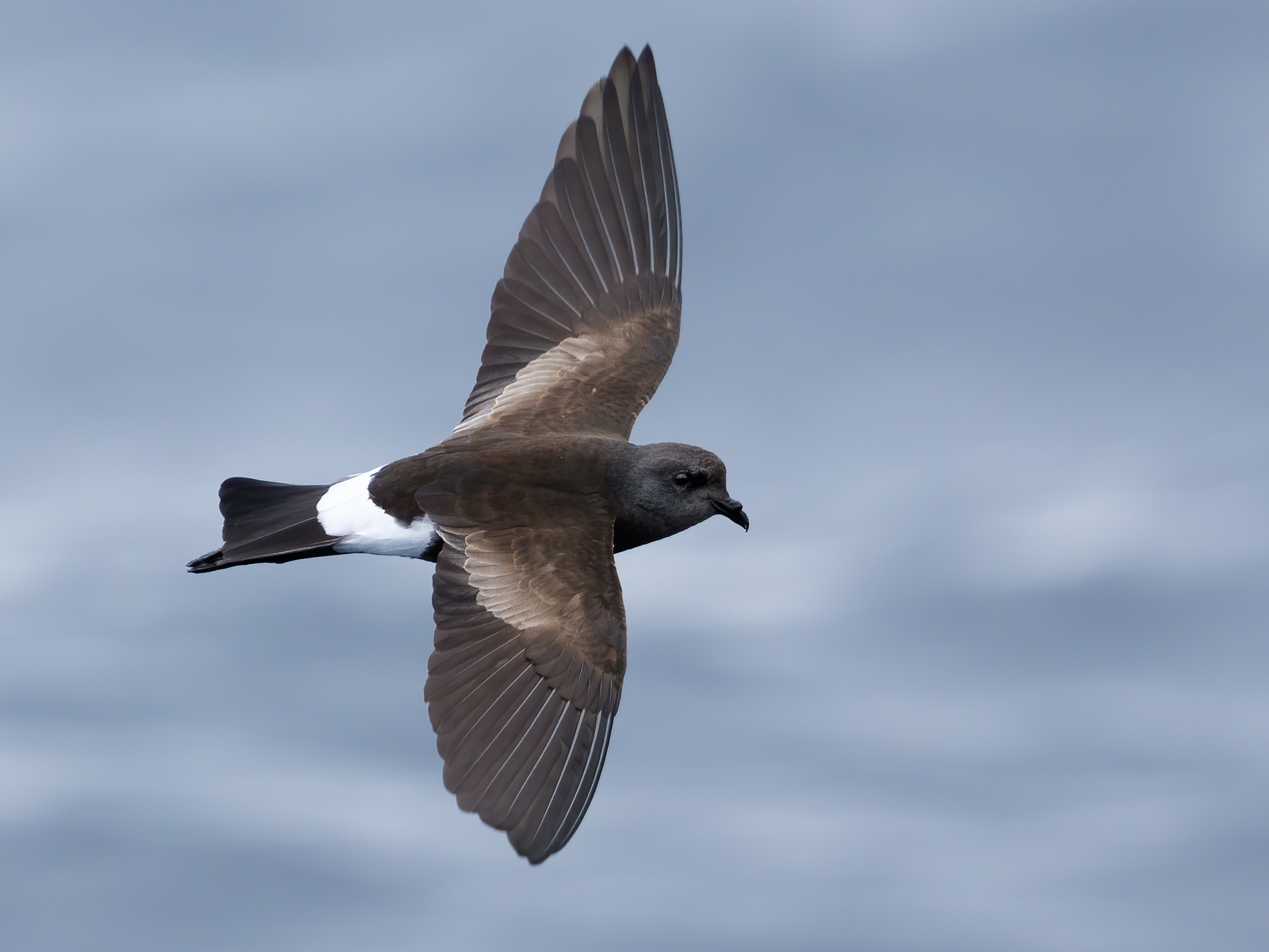

Conservation status
- Least Concern (IUCN 3.1)

Scientific classification
- Kingdom: Animalia
- Phylum: Chordata
- Class: Aves
- Order: Procellariiformes
- Family: Oceanitidae
- Genus: Oceanites
- Species: O. oceanicus

Binomial name
- Oceanites oceanicus (Kuhl, 1820)
- Distribution range (blue)

= Wilson's storm petrel =

Species of bird

Wilson's storm petrel (Oceanites oceanicus), also known as Wilson's petrel, is a small seabird of the austral storm petrel family Oceanitidae. It is one of the most abundant bird species in the world and has a circumpolar distribution mainly in the seas of the southern hemisphere but extending northwards during the summer of the northern hemisphere. The world population was estimated in 2022 as stable at 8–20 million birds. In 2010 it had been estimated at 12–30 million. A 1998 book had estimated more than 50 million pairs. The name commemorates the Scottish-American ornithologist Alexander Wilson. The genus name Oceanites refers to the mythical Oceanids, the three thousand daughters of Tethys. The species name is from Latin oceanus, "ocean".

== Taxonomy ==
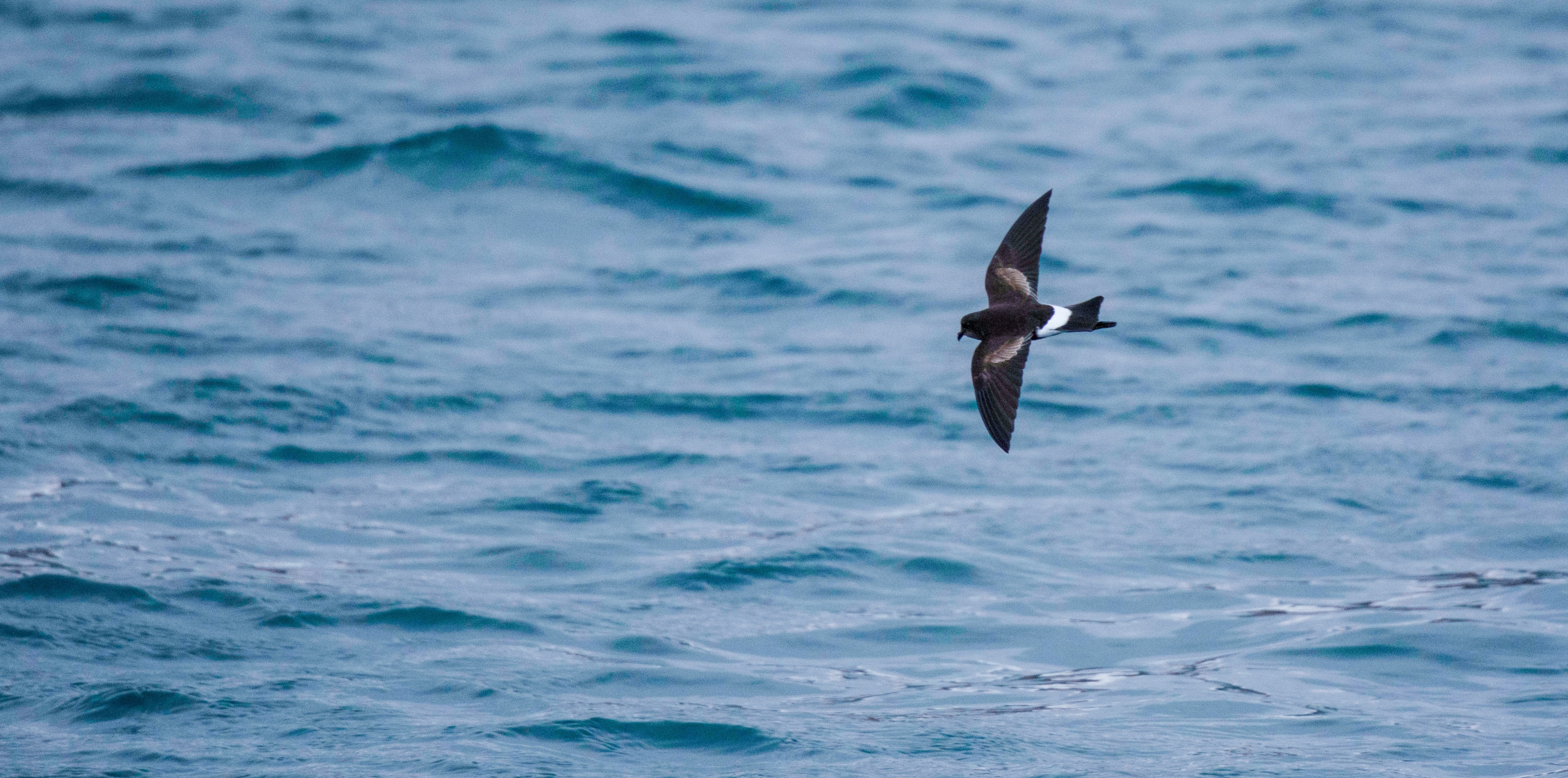
Wilson's Storm Petrel showing the distinctive markings across the upper wing

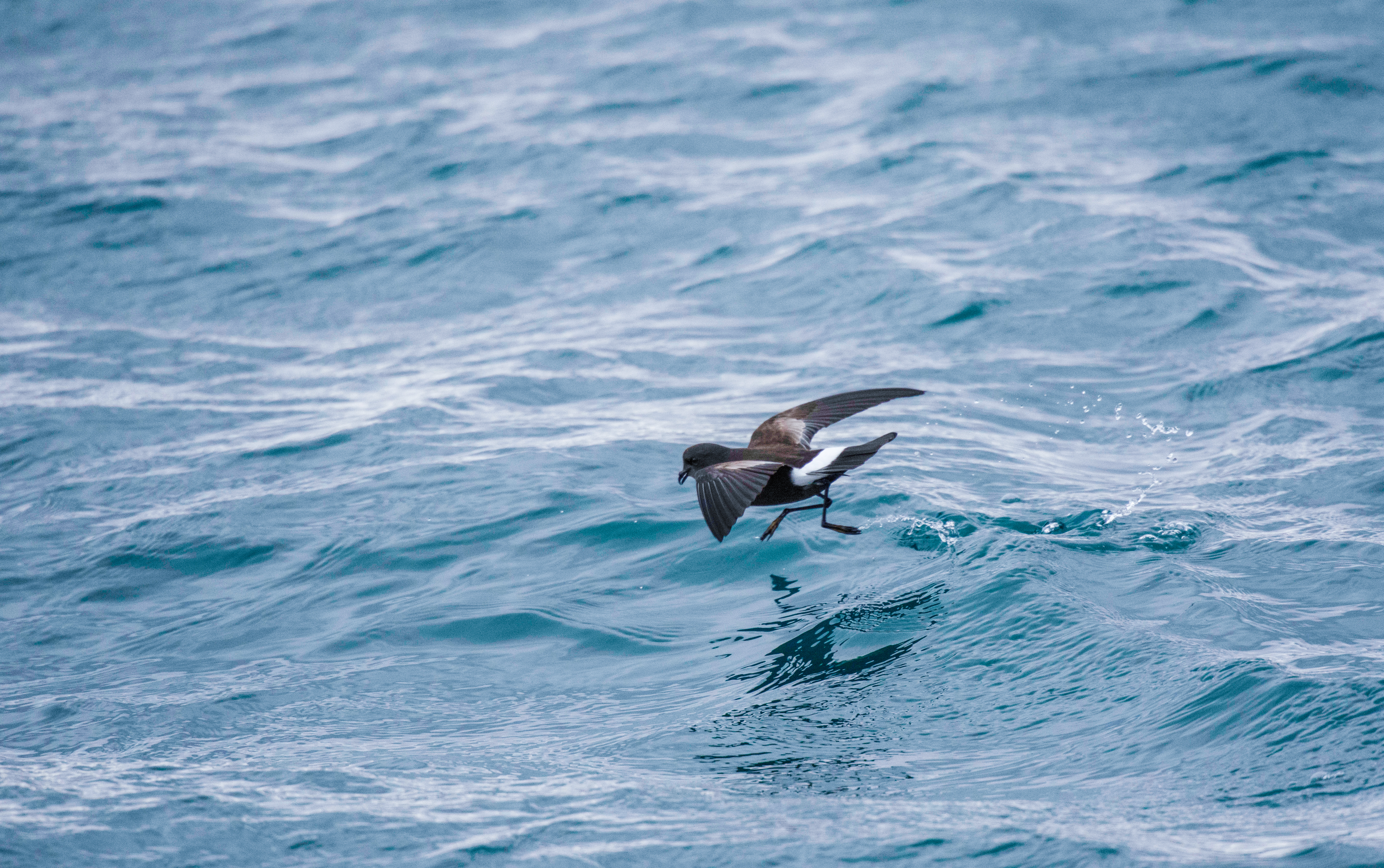
Wilson's Storm Petrel pattering across water during feeding

Originally described in the genus Procellaria it has been placed under the genus Oceanites. Two or three subspecies are recognized and one population maorianus from New Zealand may be extinct. The nominate population breeds from Cape Horn to the Kerguelen Islands while exasperatus breeds along the Antarctic coast in the South Shetland and other islands. The population from Tierra del Fuego was described as chilensis (=wollastoni, magellanicus) but this is considered a nomen nudum although some authors have reinstated it, noting that it can be distinguished by white mottling on the belly.

The name Mother Carey's chicken was used in early literature and often applied to several petrel species while the generic name of stormy petrel referred to the idea that their appearance foretold stormy weather. F. M. Littler and others called it the yellow-webbed storm-petrel.

== Description ==
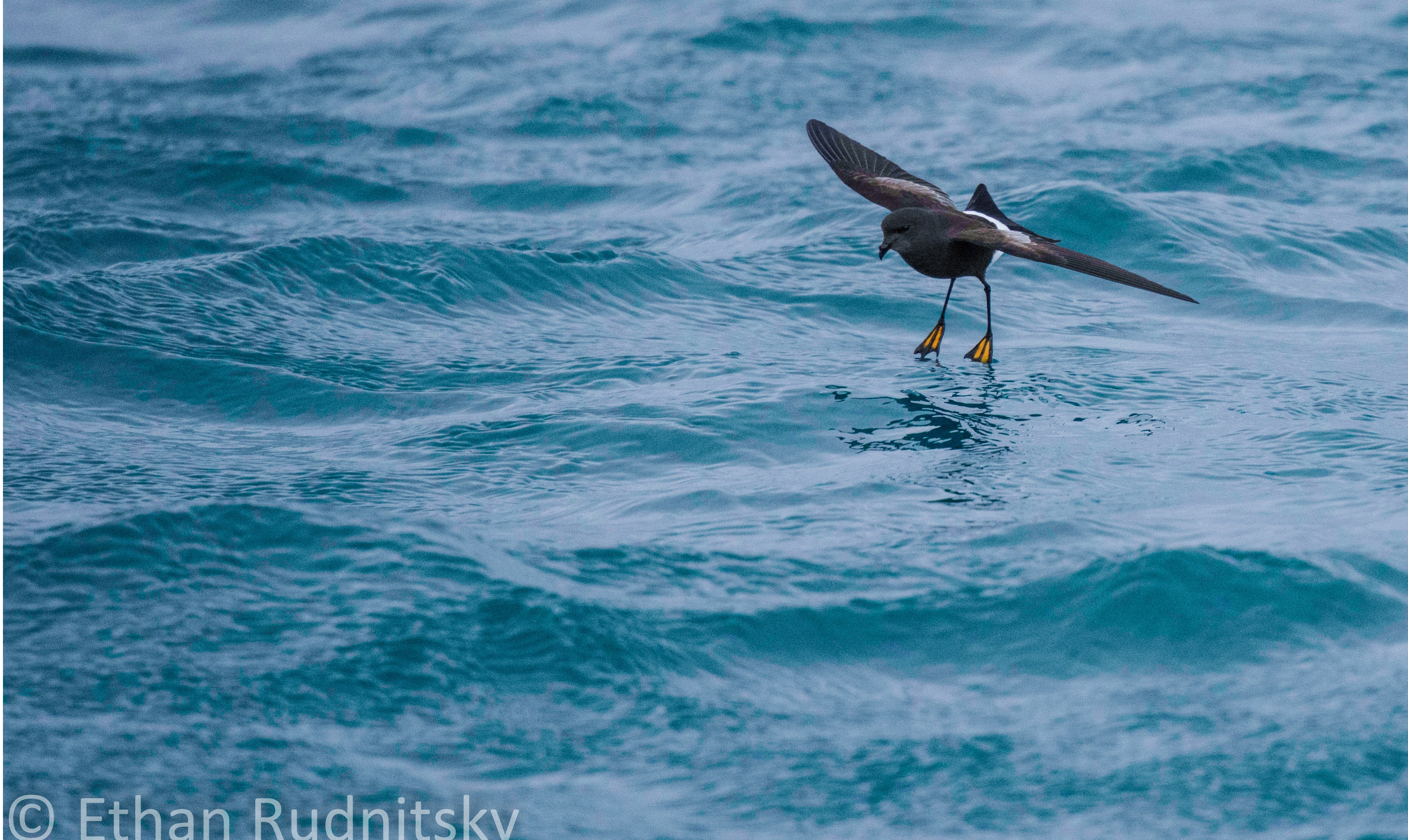
Wilson's Storm Petrel with distinctive yellow webbing between its toes

Wilson's storm petrel is a small bird, 16–18.5 cm (6.3–7.3 in) in length with a 38–42 cm (15–16.5 in) wingspan. It is slightly larger than the European storm petrel and is essentially dark brown in all plumages, except for the white rump and flanks. The feet extend just beyond the square ended tail in flight. The European storm petrel has a very distinct whitish lining to the underwing and a nearly all dark upperwing. Wilson's storm petrel has a diffuse pale band along the upper wing coverts and lacks the distinctive white underwing lining. The webbing between the toes is yellow with black spots in pre-breeding age individuals.

== Distribution and habitat ==
This species breeds on the Antarctic coastlines and nearby islands such as the South Shetland Islands during the summer of the southern hemisphere. It spends the rest of the year at sea, and moves into the northern oceans in the southern hemisphere's winter. It is much more common in the north Atlantic than the Pacific. Wilson's storm petrel is common off eastern North America in the northern summer and the seasonal abundance of this bird in suitable European waters has been revealed through pelagic boat trips, most notably in the area of the Isles of Scilly and Great Britain.

It is strictly pelagic outside the breeding season, and this, together with its remote breeding sites, makes Wilson's petrel a difficult bird to see from land. Only in severe storms might this species be pushed into headlands.

== Behaviour and ecology ==
Wilson's storm petrel has a more direct gliding flight than other small petrels, and like most others it flies low over the seas surface and has the habit of pattering on the water surface as it picks planktonic food items from the ocean surface. Their unique fluttering and hovering flight is achieved often with their wings held high. Even in calm weather, they can make use of the slight breeze produced by the waves and in effect soar while using their feet to stabilize themselves. Like the European storm petrel, it is highly gregarious, and will also follow ships and fishing boats. A soft peeping noise is often heard while the birds are feeding. They feed predominantly on planktonic invertebrates close to the surface, rarely plunging below the surface to capture prey. They may however sometimes take 3–8 cm long fish in the family Myctophidae.

At 40 g on average, it is the smallest warm-blooded animal that breeds in the Antarctic region. It nests in colonies close to the sea in rock crevices or small burrows in soft earth and lays a single white egg. Like most petrels, its walking ability is limited to a short shuffle to the burrow. In the Antarctic, nests may sometimes get snowed over leading to destruction of the nest or chicks. This storm petrel is strictly nocturnal at the breeding sites to avoid predation by larger gulls and skuas, and will even avoid coming to land on clear moonlit nights. Both parents tend the nest and feed the single chick. The chicks call and beg for food, more vigorously when hungry. Chicks remain at nest for about 60 days and are fed on krill, fish and amphipods. Adults have the ability to identify their nest burrows in the dark and their mates by olfactory cues.

Population estimates in Antarctica evaluate the species to have about between 10^{5} and 10^{6} pairs. Widespread throughout its large range, Wilson's storm petrel is evaluated as least concern on the IUCN Red List of Threatened Species.

== Other sources ==
- Harrison, Peter (1996). Seabirds of the World. Princeton: Princeton University Press. ISBN 0-691-01551-1.
- Bull, John; Farrand Jr., John (April 1984). The Audubon Society Field Guide to North American Birds, Eastern Region. New York: Alfred A. Knopf. ISBN 0-394-41405-5.
- Beck, J.R. & Brown, D.W. 1972. The Biology of Wilson's Storm Petrel, Oceanites oceanicus (Kuhl) at Signy Island, South Orkney Islands. British Antarctic Survey Scientific Reports No. 69.
- Bourne, W.R.P. 1983. Letters (The 'yellow webs' of Wilson's Storm-petrel). British Birds 76(7): 316–317.
- Bourne, W.R.P. 1987. Parallel variation in the markings of Wilson's and Leach's Storm-petrels. Sea Swallow 36: 64.
- Bourne, W.R.P. 1988. Letters (John Gould and the storm-petrels). British Birds 81(8): 402–403.
- British Ornithologists' Union 2008. British Ornithologists' Union Records Committee: 36th Report (November 2007). Ibis 150: 218–220.
- Copestake, P.G. & Croxall, J.P. 1985. Aspects of the breeding biology of Wilson's Storm Petrel Oceanites oceanicus at Bird Island, South Georgia. British Antarctic Survey Bulletin 66: 7–17.
- Croxall, J.P. et al. 1988. Food and feeding ecology of Wilson's storm petrel Oceanites oceanicus at South Georgia. Journal of Zoology 216: 83–102.
- Curtis, W.F. 1988. An example of melanism in Wilson's Storm-petrel. Sea Swallow 37: 63.
- Flood, R.L. 2011. Notes (Wilson's Storm-petrel with white stripes on the underwing). British Birds 104(5): 272–273.
- Gebczynski, A.K. 2003. The food demand in the nest of Wilson's storm petrel. Polish Polar Research 24(2): 127–131.
- Orgeira, J.L. 1997. Nidificacion y habitat del Petrel de Wilson (Oceanites oceanicus) en Punta Cierva, Costa de Danco, peninsula Antarctica [Nesting habitat of Wilson's Petrel (Oceanites oceanicus) at Cierva Point, Danco, Antarctic peninsula]. Ornitologia Neotropical 8: 49–56.
- Orgeira, J.L. 1997. Short communications (An infrared device for finding Wilson's Storm Petrel Oceanites oceanicus nests). Marine Ornithology 25: 75–76.
- Quillefeldt, P. 2002. Seasonal and annual variation in the diet of breeding and non-breeding Wilson's storm-petrel on King George Island, South Shetland Islands. Polar Biology 25: 216–221.
- van den Berg, A.B.; Bosman, Cecilia A. W.; Rozendaal, Frank G. (1982). "Mass movement of Bridled Terns Sterna anaethetus and Wilson's Petrels Oceanites oceanicus off Colombo, Sri Lanka" (PDF). Ardea. 70: 81–82.
- Wasilewski, A. 1986. Ecological aspects of the breeding cycle in the Petrel de Wilson, Oceanites oceanicus (Kuhl), at King George Island (South Shetland Islands, Antarctica). Polish Polar Research 7: 173–216.
