= Boris Mironov (historian) =

Soviet and Russian historian and cliometrist

- Бори́с Никола́евич Миро́нов
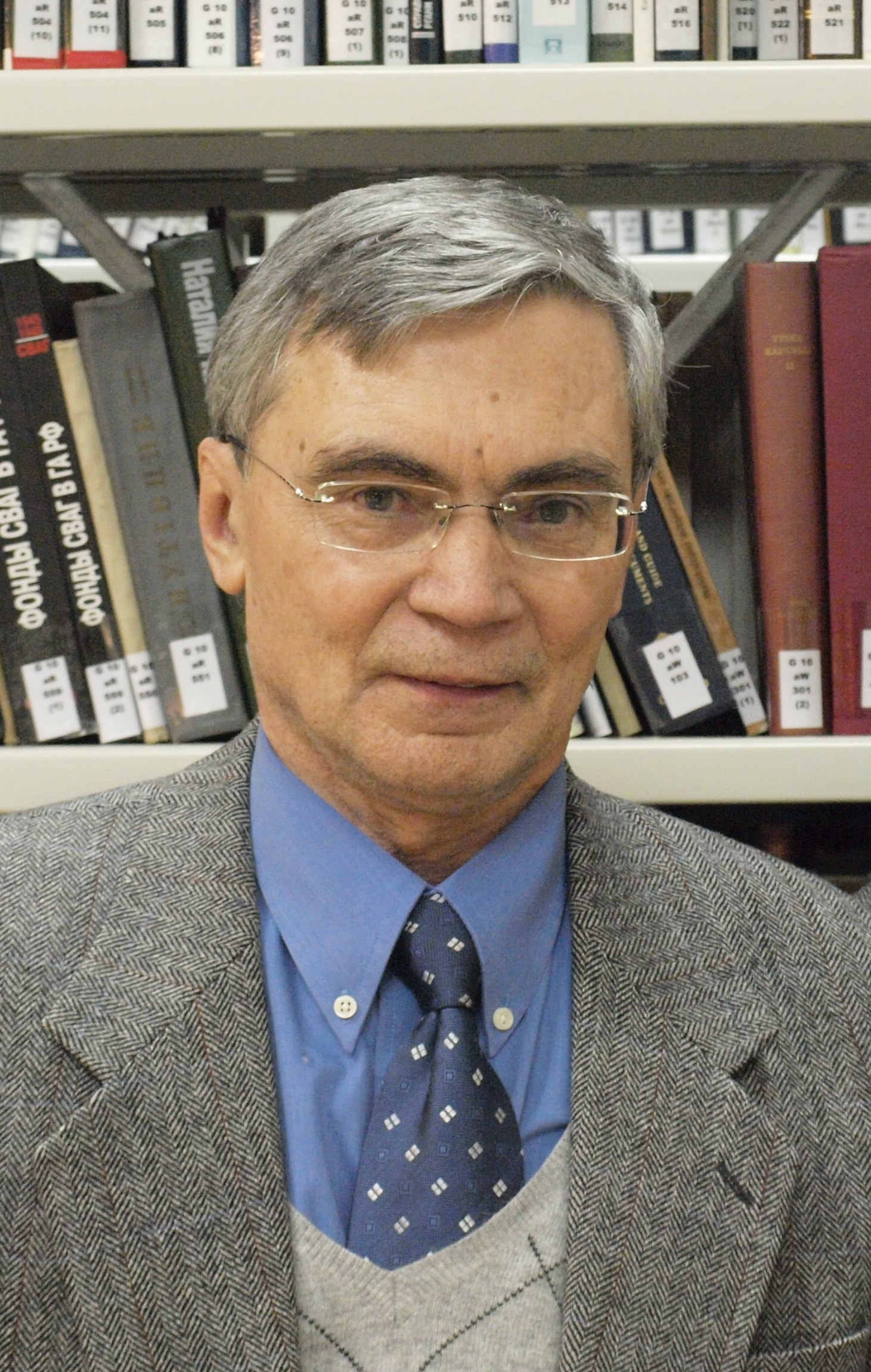
- Mironov in 2011
- Born: 21 September 1942 (age 83); Marks, Saratov Region (RSFSR, Soviet Union)
- Education: Leningrad State University
- Known for: Researcher-encyclopedist of social history of Russian Empire.
- Scientific career
- Fields: history of Russia, social history, historical sociology, economic history, anthropometric history, historiography, demography, cliometrics
- Workplaces: Saint Petersburg State University

Boris Nikolaevich Mironov (Russian: Бори́с Никола́евич Миро́нов) (born September 21, 1942) is a Soviet and Russian historian, cliometrist, specialist in the field of historical sociology, social, economic and demographic history of Russia, anthropometric history and research methodology.

== Biography ==
Mironov was born in 1942 in Marks, Saratov Region (USSR).

Graduated from Leningrad State University, the Department of History (1965).

Worked at the St. Petersburg Institute of History of the Russian Academy of Sciences (1970–2016) and at Herzen University (1978–1981).

Doctor of Historical Sciences (1983), Professor of St. Petersburg State University (1990–1993 and from 2000 to the present).

Taught at universities in Canada, the United States, France, Germany and Japan (1993–2003).

Author of over 390 works, of which over a hundred articles have been published in leading international journals in English, Chinese, German, French, Spanish, Japanese, and other languages. Two monographs (“The Social History of Imperial Russia, 1700—1917” and “The Standard of Living and Revolutions in Russia, 1700—1917”) were translated into English and Chinese.

== Publications ==
=== Main monographs in Russian ===
- Mironov B. N. Vnutrenniy rynok Rossii vo vtoroy polovine XVIII — pervoy polovine XIX v. Leningrad: Nauka, 1981. — 259 s.
- Mironov B. N. Khlebnyye tseny v Rossii za dva stoletiya (XVIII—XIX vv.). Leningrad: Nauka, 1985. — 301 s.
- Mironov B. N. Russkiy gorod v 1740—1860-ye gody: demograficheskoye, sotsial'noye i ekonomicheskoye razvitiye. Leningrad: Nauka, 1990. — 271 s.
- Mironov B. N. Sotsialnaya istoriya Rossii perioda imperii (XVIII — nachalo XX veka): Genezis lichnosti, demokraticheskoy semi, grazhdanskogo obschestva i pravovogo gosudarstva. V 2-h tt. Saint Petersburg: Dm. Bulanin, 1999.
  - Second edition. In 2 vol. Saint Petersburg: Dm. Bulanin, 2000.
  - Third Edition. In 2 vol. Saint Petersburg: Dm. Bulanin, 2003. — ISBN 5-86007-394-1
- Mironov B. N. Blagosostoyanie naseleniya i revolyutsii v imperskoy Rossii: XVIII — nachalo XX veka. Moscow: Novyiy hronograf, 2010. — 911 s. — ISBN 978-5-94881-081-2
  - Second edition. In 2 vol. Moscow: Ves mir, 2012. — ISBN 978-5-7777-0545-7
- Mironov B. N. Rossiyskaya imperiya: ot traditsii k modernu. V 3-h tt. Saint Petersburg: Dmitriy Bulanin, 2015, 2016. — ISBN 978-5-86007-725-6
  - Second edition. In 3 vol. Saint Petersburg: Dm. Bulanin, 2018.
- Mironov B. N. Upravlenie etnicheskim mnogoobraziem Rossiyskoy imperii. Saint Petersburg: Dmitriy Bulanin, 2017. — 640 s.

=== Monographs in English ===
- Boris N. Mironov. The Social History of Imperial Russia, 1700–1917. Boulder: Westview Press, 2000. Vol. 1, 2.

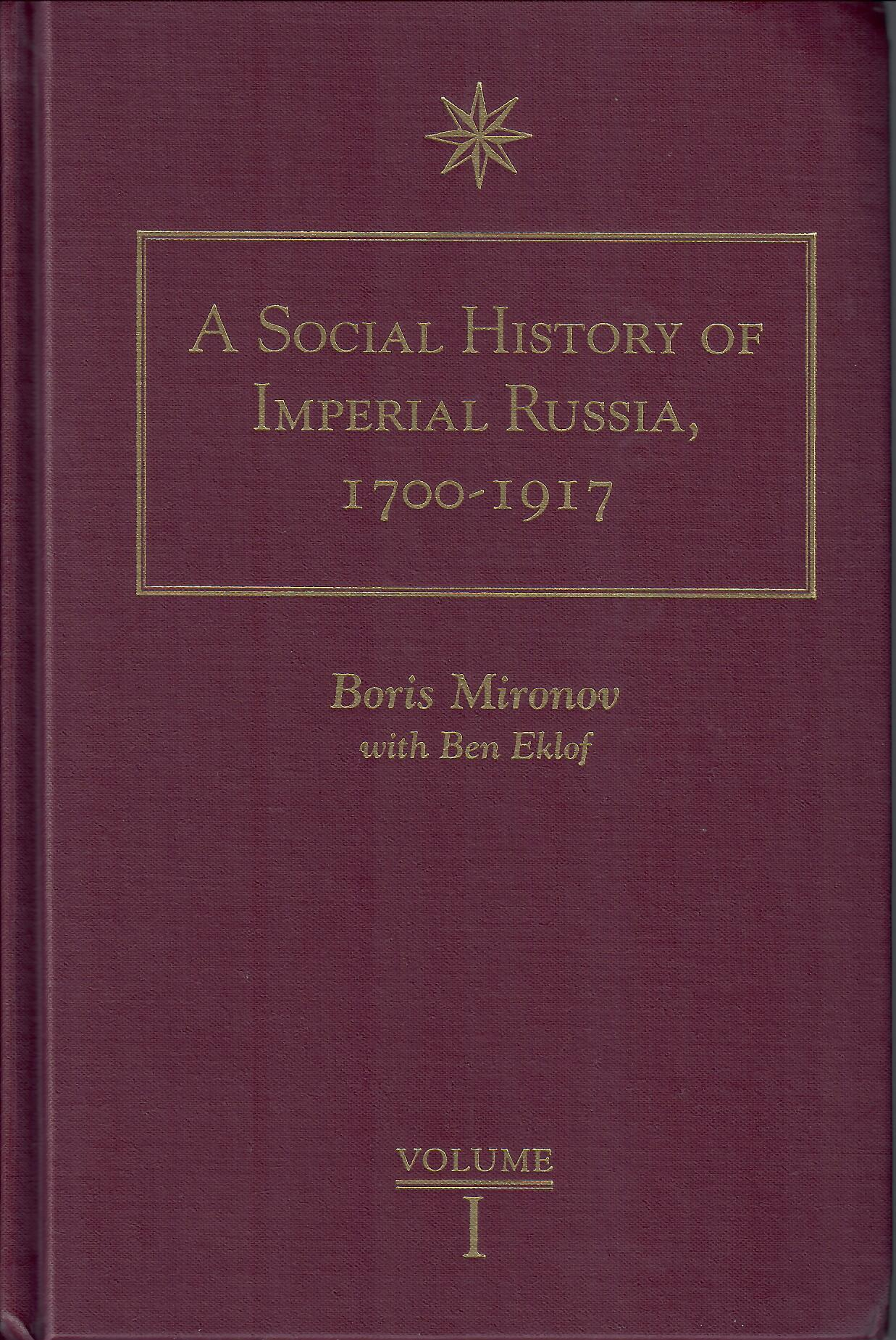
Mironov Boris. Social History. Vol 1. 2000.

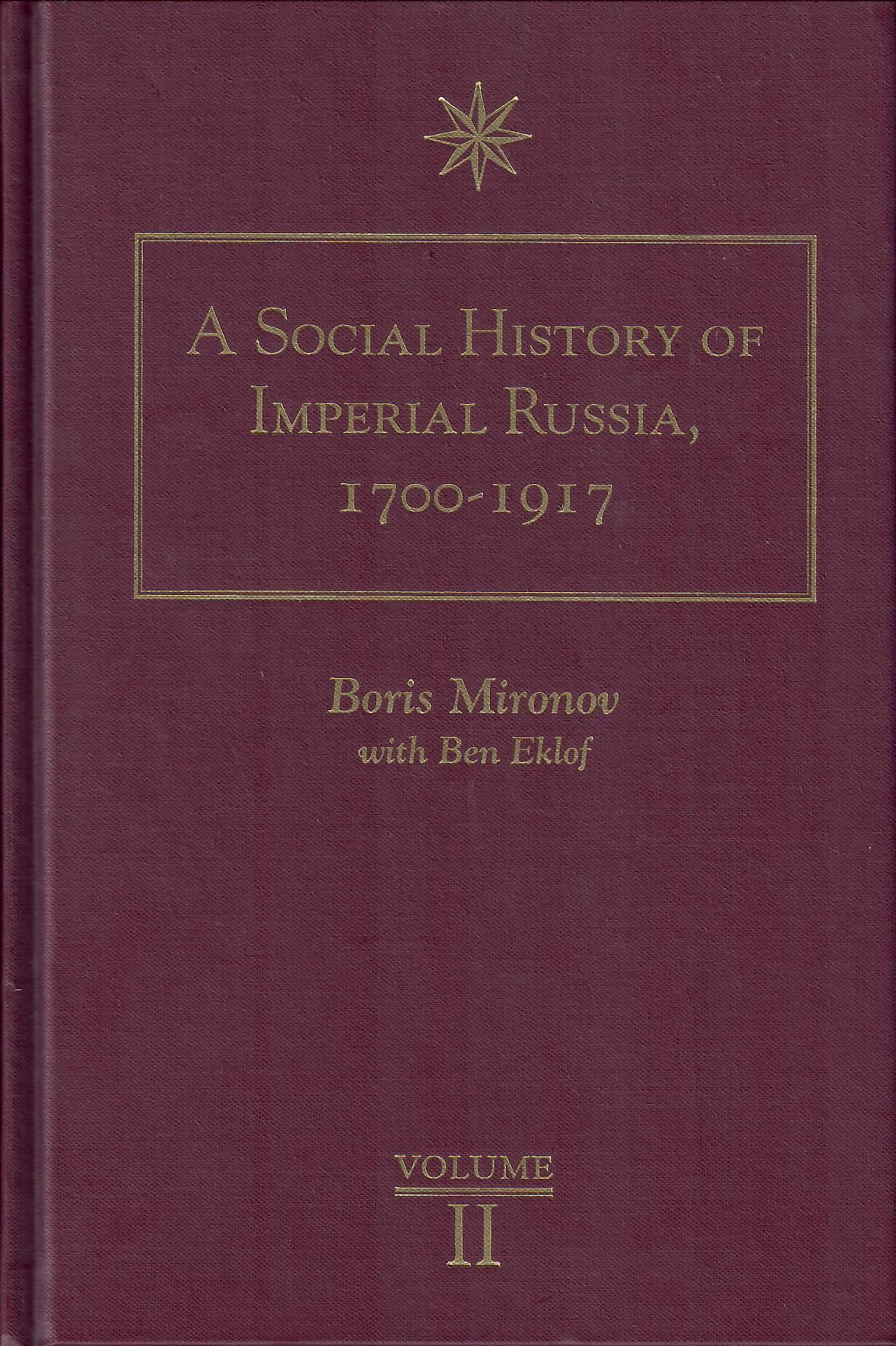
Mironov Boris. Social History. Vol 2. 2000.

- Boris N. Mironov. The Standard of Living and Revolutions in Russia, 1700–1917. London and New York: Routledge, Taylor and Francis Group, 2012. —668 p. — ISBN 0-415-60854-6

=== Reviews of Mironov's monographs in English ===
- Lewis R. D. [Review] // The American Historical Review. 1978. Vol. 83. No 3. P. 688.
- McKay J. P. [Review] // Slavic Review. 1984. Vol. 43. No 1. P. 99–101.
- Hock, Steven. [Review] // Slavic Review, Vol. 46. Fall/Winter. 1987. P. 596–597.
- Gregory, Paul. [Review] // The American Historical Review. Vol. 93. February 1988. P. 195.
- Leonard C. [Review] // The Russian Review. Vol. 47. No. 4 (Oct., 1988). P. 459.
- Bater, James H. [Review] // The American Historical Review. Vol. 97. No. 3. 1992. P. 893–894.
- Brower, Daniel. [Review] // Slavic Review. Vol. 51. No. 2. 1992. P. 365–366.
- Le Donne J. Review // Study Group on Eighteenth-Century Russia Newsletter. 1992. Vol. 20.
- Alexander, John T. [Review] // History: Reviews of New Books. 2000. Vol. 28. No. 2. Winter.
- Saul, Norman E. [Review] // History: Reviews of New Books. 2000. Vol. 28. No. 23. Spring.
- Okenfus M. J. A Social History of the Russian Empire and of Imperial Russia // Jahrbucher für Osteuropaeische Geschichte. 2001. Nr. 1. S. 96–99.
- Ransel D. L. A Single Research Community: Not Yet // Slavic Review. 2001. Vol. 60. No. 3. (Autumn, 2001). P. 550–557.
- Rieber A. J. [Review] // The Journal of Modern History. Vol. 73. No. 4 (December 2001). P. 993–995.
- Wirtschafter, Elise Kimerling. [Review] // Kritika: Exploration in Russian and Eurasian History. Vol. 2. No. 2. Winter 2001. P. 1–7.
- Zelnik, Reginald. [Review] // The American Historical Review. December 2001. P. 1903–1904.
- Marrese M. L. [Review] A Social History of the Russian Empire // Canadian Slavonic Papers. Vol. 46. No. 1/2 (March–June 2004). P. 234–235.
- Baten J. Review // EH.Net. 2013, January.
- Cámara A. D. [Review] // Revista de Historia Industrial. 2014. No. 54. P. 181–184.
- Carrion M. M. [Review] // Economic History Research. 2014. Vol. 10 (3). P. 221–222.
- Paul R. Gregory. [Review] // Economics & Human Biology. 2014. Vol. 12. P. 172–173.
- Hoch S. L. [Review] // Russian Review. 2015. Vol. 74, iss. 2. P. 324–325.
- Sunderland W. A Glass Half-Full, Perhaps Three-Quarters: Imperial Questions in Boris Mironov's «Rossiiskaia Imperiia» // Byilyie godyi. Rossiyskiy istoricheskiy zhurnal. 2016. No. 41-1 (3). P. 955–964.
- Worobec C. D. A Qualified Optimistic Analysis of Imperial Russia // Byilyie godyi. Rossiyskiy istoricheskiy zhurnal. 2016. No. 41-1 (3). P. 981–988.

=== Monographs in Chinese ===
- Mironov B. N. Istorik i matematika (Matematicheskie metodyi v istoricheskom issledovanii). KNR, Pekin: 1990.
- Mironov B. N. Istorik i sotsiologiya. Leningrad: Nauka, 1984. KNR, Pekin: 1988. — 174 s.
- Mironov B. N. Sotsialnaya istoriya Rossii perioda imperii (XVIII — nachalo XX v.): Genezis lichnosti, demokraticheskoy semi, grazhdanskogo obschestva i pravovogo gosudarstva. Izd. 3-e ispr. V 2-h tt. Dzinan (Jinan): Izd-vo Shandonskogo un-ta (Shan-Dong University Press), 2006. V 2 tt.
- Mironov B. N. Blagosostoyanie naseleniya i revolyutsii v imperskoy Rossii: XVIII — nachalo HH veka. Shanhay: 2013. —825 s.

=== Articles in English ===
- Mironov B. N. The Russian Peasant Commune after the Reforms of the 1860s // Slavic Review. 1985. Т. 44. No. 3. P. 438–467.
- Mironov B. N. The Development of Literacy in Russia and the USSR from the Tenth to the Twentieth Centuries // History of Education Quarterly. 1991. Т. 31. No. 2. P. 229–252.
- Mironov B. N. Consequences of the Price Revolution in Eighteenth—century Russia // The Economic History Review. Vol. 45. No. 3. August 1992. P. 457–478.
- Mironov B. N. Bureaucratic— or Self—Government: The Early Nineteenth Century Russian City // Slavic Review. Vol. 52. No. 2. Summer 1993. P. 233–255.
- Mironov B. N. Local Government in Russia in the First Half of the Nineteenth Century: Provincial Government and Government and Estate Self—Government // Jahrbücher fur Geschichte Osteuropas. Bd. 42 (1994). Hf. 2. P. 161–201.
- Mironov B. N. Diet, Health and Stature of the Russian Population from the Mid-Nineteenth to the Beginning of the Twentieth Century // The Biological Standard of Living in Three Continents Further Explorations In Anthropometric History. Boulder, 1995. P. 59–80.
- Mironov B. N. When and Why was the Russian Peasantry Emancipated // Serfdom and Slavery / Michael Bush (ed.). London: Longman, 1996. P. 323–347.
- Mironov B. N. New Approaches to Old Problems: the Well-Being of the Population of Russia from 1821 to 1910 as Measured by Physical Stature // Slavic Review. 1999. Т. 58. No. 1. P. 1–26.
- Mironov B. N. The Burden of Grandeur: Physical and Economic Well-Being of the Russian Population in the Eighteenth Century // Living Standards in the Past: New Perspectives on Well-Being in Asia and Europe. 2005. P. 255–276.
- Mironov B. N. Russian Living Standards under the Tsars: Anthropometric Evidence from the Volga // The Journal of Economic History. Vol. 68. No. 3 (September 2008). P. 900–929. Co-authored with Brian A'Hearn.
- Mironov B. N. Wages and Prices in Imperial Russia, 1703—1913 // The Russian Review. 2010. Т. 69. No. 1. P. 47–72.
- Mironov B. N. Anthropometric Measures of Birth and Stature: Perspectives on Russian Mothers and Newborns // Handbook of Anthropometry: Physical Measures of Human Form in Health and Disease 2012. С. 2561–2580.
- Mironov B. N. Long-term Trends in the Development of the Family Structure in Christian Russia from the 16th to the 20th Century: An Analytical Overview of Historiography // Journal of Family History: Studies in Family, Kinship, Gender, and Demography. October 2016. Vol. 41 (4). P. 355–377.
- Mironov B. N. The Challenge of Space and the Technologies of Management of Ethno-Confessional Diversity in the Russian Empire // Russian History. Vol. 44. 2017. No. 1. P. 25–46.
- Mironov B. N. Cannon Fodder for the Revolution: The Russian Proletariat in 1917 // Kritika: Explorations in Russian and Eurasian History. Vol. 18, No. 2 (Spring 2017). P. 351–370.

=== The general list of works ===
- The general list of works in the Information Base of the Russian Science Citation Index
- Boris Nikolayevich Mironov: Biobibliograficheskiy ukazatel' trudov: 1964—2018 / Otv. red. A. Kh. Daudov; sost. T. Ye. Sokhor. — Saint Petersburg: Dm. Bulanin, 2019. — 176 s. — ISBN 978-5-86007-904-5 (in Russian)

== Membership in editorial boards, editorial boards of magazines ==
- «Russian History» (Connecticut, USA)
- «Economic and Social History Review» (Beijing, China)
- «Bulletin of St. Petersburg University. History»
- «Demographic Review»
- «Past years. Russian Historical Journal»

== Fellowships, grants ==
- Grant at the Center for Russian and East European Studies at the University of Toronto (Toronto, Canada. 1989)
- Grant at the National Institute for Agricultural History Studies (Paris. 1990/1991)
- Grant at Waseda University (Tokyo. 1992)
- Fellowship of the Woodrow Wilson International Center (Washington, 1992–1993)
- Grant at Benefeld University (Benefeld, Germany. 1994)
- Grant at the University of Oregon (Eugene, United States. 1996)
- Grant at the University of Tübingen (Tübingen, Germany. 1997)
- Fellowship of the Slavic Research Center of Hokkaido University (Sapporo, Japan. 1997–1998)
- Grant at the University of California (Davis (California), United States. 2001)
- Grants at Jilin University (China. 2003, 2005, 2010, 2012)
- Member of the international project "Russian-French trade in the XVIII - early XX centuries." Institute of Agrarian Studies (Paris, France. 1990–1992)
- Member of the International Project "The Global Price and Income History Group". (Project Leader Professor Piter Lindert), University of California, United States. 2001–2017)
- Participant of the International project "Integration of national markets into the world market and its impact on the welfare of the population" at the European University. (Project leader Professor Giovanni Federico), Florence, Italy. 2010–2012)

== Literature ==
- Mironov Boris Nikolayevich // Istoriki Rossii XX veka: Biobibliograficheskiy slovar' / Sost. A. A. Chernobayev. — Saratov: 2005. Vol. 2. P. 58. (in Russian)
- Mironov Boris Nikolayevich // Chernobayev A. A. Istoriki Rossii kontsa XIX — nachala XXI veka: Biobibliograficheskiy slovar'. V 3 t. — Moscow: 2017. Vol. 2. P. 344. (in Russian)
