= Thomas Coward =

English ornithologist, amateur astronomer, journalist and writer

Thomas Alfred Coward MSc FZS FRES MBOU
- Born: 8 January 1867; Bowdon Cheshire
- Died: 29 January 1933 (aged 66); Lower Bowdon, Cheshire
- Education: Owens College (now Manchester University)
- Occupations: Company manager; Museum keeper
- Writing career
- Period: Late C19-
- Subjects: Natural history; Ornithology
- Notable works: The Birds of the British Isles and Their Eggs

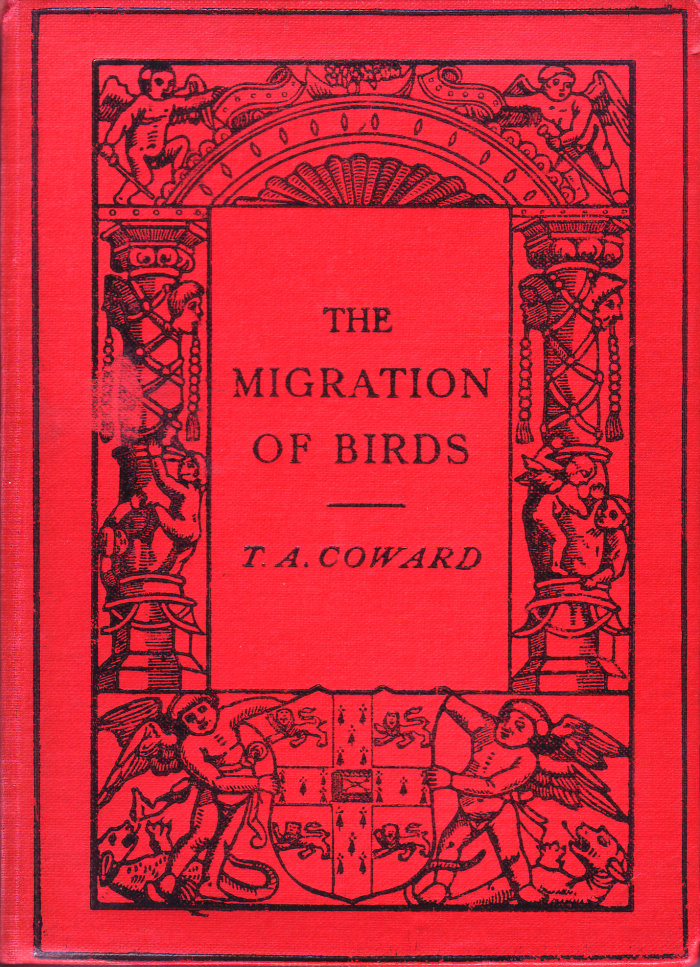
Cover of The Migration of Birds. Aside from the coat-of-arms and lettering, the design is that used by the earliest known Cambridge printer, John Siberch, in 1521.

Thomas Alfred Coward FZS FRES MBOU (8 January 1867 – 29 January 1933), was an English ornithologist and an amateur astronomer. He wrote extensively on natural history, local history and Cheshire.

== Life ==
He was born at 8 Higher Downs, Bowdon, Cheshire (now Greater Manchester) on 8 January 1867, the fourth and last child of Thomas and Sarah Coward. His father was a Congregational minister and in business as a partner in the firm of Melland and Coward, textile bleachers. Coward's siblings were Charles, Alice and Annie.

After an education at Brooklands School, Sale and at Owens College (now Manchester University), Coward worked in the family business for 19 years, before it was taken over by the Bleachers' Association. His share of the proceeds from the sale of Melland and Coward was sufficient to allow him to retire from business and concentrate on his love of wildlife and the study of birds, which had developed as a child. He began writing articles on natural history for newspapers including The Liverpool Daily Post, The Chester Cournant and The Manchester Guardian for which he wrote the "Country Diary" column until his death. General interest magazines for which he wrote included The Field and Country Life and in specialist journals such as The Zoologist, Proceedings of the Zoological Society of London and British Birds.

His first book was The Birds of Cheshire, published in 1900, when he was living in Hale. His three-volume The Birds of the British Isles and their eggs (1920–25) was illustrated by Archibald Thorburn and was "acknowledged as being the book that did more to popularise the study of birds than any other publication produced during the first part of the twentieth century". It was revised by Arnold Boyd for a new edition in 1950.

He co-wrote articles and books on ornithology with Charles Oldham, a former schoolmate.

He married his cousin Mary Milne in 1904. There is a Blue Plaque at his former home, Brentwood Villa, 6 Grange Road, Bowdon, to which he moved in 1911.

In the 1920s, he gave a number of talks in natural history subjects, on 2ZY, the BBC's Manchester-based radio station.

On his death, the 14-acre (57,000 m^{2}) Cotterill Clough Nature Reserve was bought, by public subscription, in his honour.

His field notes are archived in the Department of Zoology at Oxford.

=== Jizz ===
Coward is credited with the first use in print of the term "Jizz", in his "Country Diary" column of 6 December 1921 - the piece was subsequently included in his 1922 book "Bird Haunts and Nature Memories". He attributed it to "a west-coast Irishman".

== Positions ==
- Acting Keeper of the Manchester Museum (During World War I)
- Chairman and President of the Altrincham and District Natural History and Literary Society
- President of the Manchester Literary and Philosophical Society from 1921 to 1923

== Bibliography ==
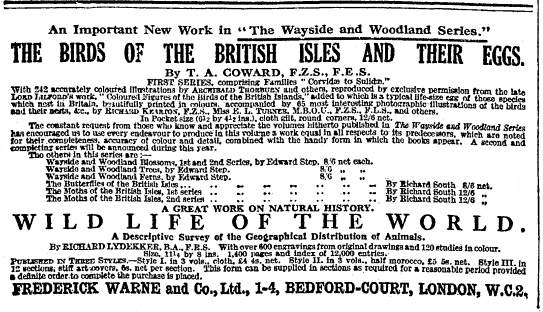
Press advertisement for The Birds of the British Isles and their Eggs, published in The Times, London, 6 February 1920

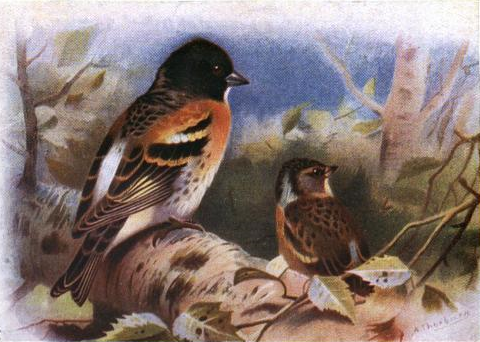
Brambling by Archibald Thorburn, one of the illustrations from The Birds of the British Isles and their Eggs

Coward wrote a number of books on local history, natural history and birds:

- The Birds of Cheshire, 1900, written jointly with Charles Oldham.
- Picturesque Cheshire
- The Vertebrate Fauna of Cheshire and Liverpool Bay, 1910, written jointly with Charles Oldham and James Johnstone.
- Cheshire. Cambridge County Geographies.
- The Migration of Birds, Cambridge University Press, 1912
- The Birds of the British Isles and their Eggs, Frederick Warne & Co, 1919 in two volumes, expanded to three in 1926
- Bird Haunts and Nature Memories, Frederick Warne & Co, 1922
- Birds and their Young
- Life of the Wayside and Woodland
- Birds at Home and Abroad
- Life of Birds
- Bird and Other Nature Problems, Frederick Warne & Co, 1931
- Cheshire – Traditions and History
- The Mammalian Fauna of Cheshire

=== Contributions ===
- The Practical Handbook of British Birds, Witherby & Co, 1920
- White, Walter Walmesley (1931). Bird life in Devon. London: J. Cape. pp. 256 p, [12] leaves of plates : ill (music), 20 cm. (Foreword)

Professional and academic associations
Preceded by Sir Henry Alexander Miers	President of the Manchester Literary and Philosophical Society; 1921–23	Succeeded by Harold Baily Dixon
