= Charles Oldham (naturalist) =

English naturalist (1868–1942)

- Born: 16 April 1868; Lincoln, Lincolnshire
- Died: 13 April 1942 (aged 73); Berkhamsted, Hertfordshire
- Education: Manchester Grammar School
- Occupations: Insurer; Ornithologist
- Employer: Commercial Union Insurance Company

Charles Oldham (16 April 1868 – 13 April 1942) was an English naturalist who was an expert on ornithology and malacology.

Oldham was born in Lincoln, Lincolnshire, but grew up in Manchester, where his father, Richard Oldham, was a merchant. He was educated at Manchester Grammar School and followed a career with the Commercial Union Insurance Company first in Manchester and later in London until retirement in 1927.

He spent his spare time on his passion for natural history and was a well-regarded field naturalist. Throughout his life he contributed notes and articles to journals and he was co-author of The Birds of Cheshire (1900) and A Practical Handbook of British Birds (1919–1924). At various times he was vice-president of the Linnean Society, the Ray Society, the British Ornithologists' Union (1936–38), the British Ecological Society and the Malacological Society. He was secretary of the Hertfordshire Natural History Society (1909–19) and its president from 1920 to 1922. He also served on the council of the Conchological Society, the British Ornithologists’ Club and the Freshwater Biological Association.

He was the first person to show evidence that black-necked grebes breed in Britain.

He co-wrote articles and books on ornithology with Thomas Coward, a former schoolmate.

He died in Berkhamsted at age 73.

== Bibliography ==
- 1900 (with Thomas Coward): The Birds of Cheshire.
- 1910 (with Thomas Coward): The Mammals and Birds of Cheshire.
- 1920: contributions to: Witherby, H.F. (ed.) – A Practical Handbook of British Birds, vol. I.
- 1924: contributions to: Witherby, H.F. (ed.) – A Practical Handbook of British Birds, vol. II.
