= Mother Carey =

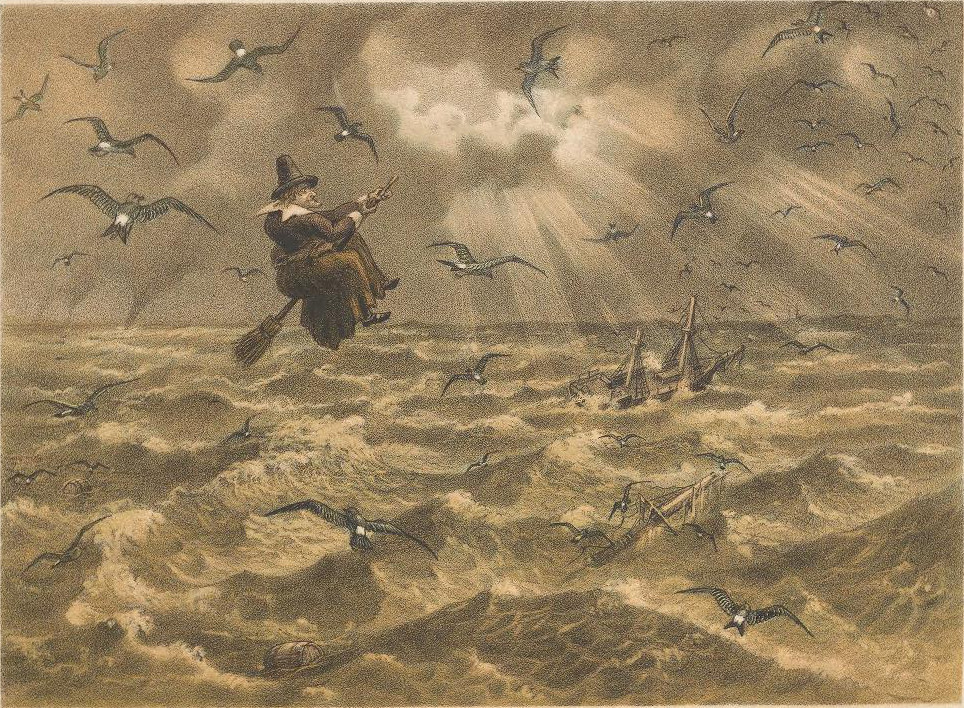
- "Mother Carey and her chickens" by J. G. Keulemans
- Created by: Traditional
- Portrayed by: John Masefield, Charles Kingsley, Jessie Willcox Smith, John Gerrard Keulemans

Mother Carey is a supernatural figure personifying the cruel and threatening sea in the imagination of 18th- and 19th-century English-speaking sailors. The entity was supposed to be a harbinger of storms and a similar character to Davy Jones (who may be her husband).

The name seems to be derived from the Latin expression Mater cara ("Precious Mother"), which sometimes refers to the Virgin Mary.

John Masefield described her in the poem "Mother Carey (as told me by the bo'sun)" in his collection Salt Water Ballads (1902). Here she and Davy Jones are a fearsome couple responsible for storms and ship-wrecks.

In a C. Fox Smith poem entitled "Mother Carey", she calls old sailors to return to the sea.

The character appears as a fairy in Charles Kingsley's The Water-Babies. She lives near the North Pole and helps Tom find the Other-end-of-Nowhere. She is shown in one of Jessie Willcox Smith's illustrations for this book.

Storm petrels, thought by sailors to be the souls of dead seamen, are called Mother Carey's chickens. Giant petrels are known as Mother Carey's geese. In The Seaman's Manual (1790), by Lt. Robert Wilson (RN), the term Mother Carey's children is defined as "a name given by English sailors to birds which they suppose are fore-runners of a storm."

In Moby-Dick, Chapter 113, Captain Ahab interrogates the blacksmith Mr. Perth about the sparks fantailing from his hammer: "Are these thy Mother Carey's chickens, Perth? they are always flying in thy wake; birds of good omen, too, but not to all;—look here, they burn; but thou—thou liv'st among them without a scorch."

Ernest Thompson Seton's book Woodland Tales is described by the author as a collection of "Mother Carey Tales". In his use, Mother Carey is a Mother Nature figure, the "Angel of the Wild Things", who favors the strong and the wise but destroys the weak: "She loves you, but far less than she does your race. It may be that you are not wise, and if it seem best, she will drop a tear and crush you into the dust."

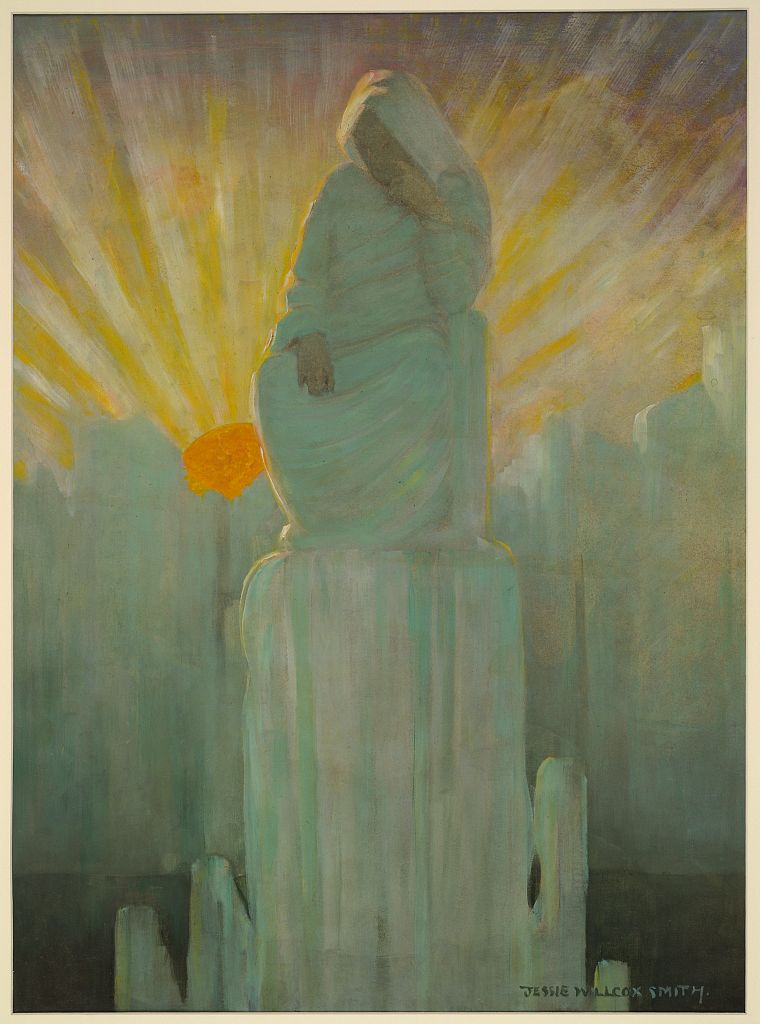
Illustration by Jessie Willcox Smith for The Water-Babies

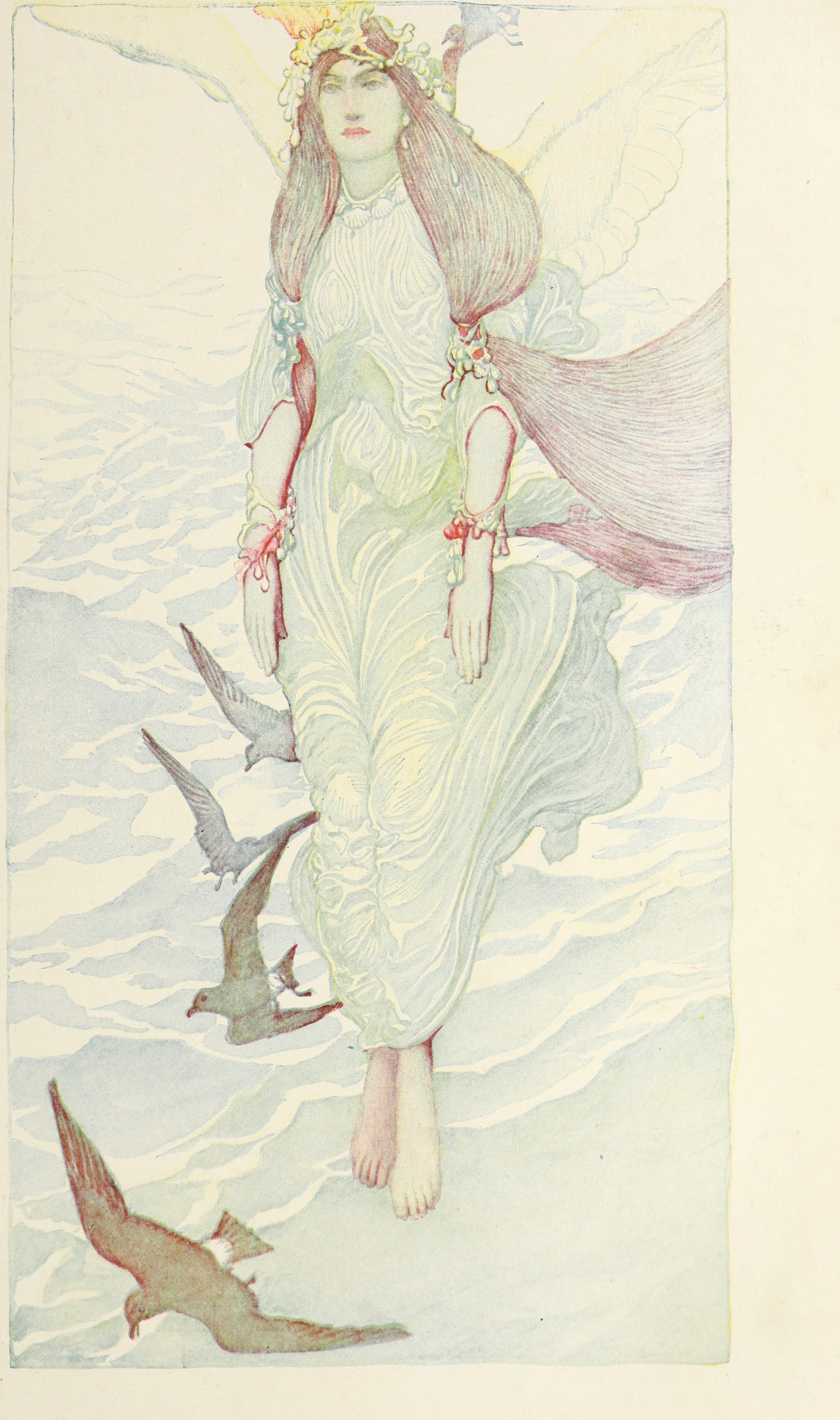
Illustration by Howard Pyle for Harper's Magazine, 1902
