= C. Fox Smith =

English poet and writer

Cicely Fox Smith
- Born: 1 February 1882; Lymm, Cheshire, United Kingdom
- Died: 8 April 1954 (aged 72); Bow, Devon, United Kingdom
- Occupations: poet, writer
- Writing career
- Language: English

Cicely Fox Smith (1 February 1882 – 8 April 1954) was an English poet and writer. Born in Lymm, Cheshire and educated at Manchester High School for Girls, she briefly lived in Canada, before returning to the United Kingdom shortly before the outbreak of World War I. She settled in Hampshire and began writing poetry, often with a nautical theme. Smith wrote over 600 poems in her life, for a wide range of publications. In later life, she expanded her writing to a number of subjects, fiction and non-fiction. For her services to literature, the British Government awarded her a small pension.

== Early life ==
Cicely Fox Smith was born 1 February 1882, into a middle-class family in Lymm, near Warrington, England during the latter half of the reign of Queen Victoria. Her father was a barrister and her grandfather was a clergyman. Smith well might have been expected to have a brief education and then to settle down to life as a homemaker either for her family or her marriage partner.

She was well educated at Manchester High School for Girls from 1894 to 1897, where she described herself later as "something of a rebel," and started writing poems at a comparatively early age. In an article for the school magazine Smith later wrote "I have a hazy recollection of epic poems after Pope's Iliad, romantic poems after Marmion stored carefully away in tin tobacco boxes when I was seven or eight." All of that early work is lost unfortunately. She published her first book of verses when she was 17 and it received favourable press comments.

Wandering the moors near her home she developed a spirit of adventure. She would follow the Holcombe Harriers hunt on foot as a girl. She had a fierce desire to travel to Africa but eventually settled for a voyage to Canada. Smith likely sailed with her sister Madge in 1911 on a steamship to Montreal, where she would then have travelled by train to Lethbridge, Alberta, staying for about a year with her older brother Richard Andrew Smith before continuing on to British Columbia (BC). From 1912 to 1913 she resided in the James Bay neighbourhood of Victoria at the southern tip of Vancouver Island, working as a typist for the BC Lands Department and later for an attorney on the waterfront. Her spare time was spent roaming nearby wharves and alleys, talking to residents and sailors alike. She listened to and learned from the sailors' tales until she too was able to speak with that authoritative nautical air that pervades her written work.

On 23 November 1913, Smith, with her mother and sister, arrived home in Liverpool aboard the White Star Line steamer RMS Teutonic on the eve of World War I. She and her family then settled in Hampshire.

== Poet ==
She soon put her experiences to use in a great outpouring of poetry, some of it clearly focused on supporting England's war efforts. Much of her poetry was from the point of view of the sailor. The detailed nautical content of her poems made it easy to understand why so many readers assumed that Smith was male. One correspondent wrote to her as "Capt. Fox Smith" and when she tried to correct him he wrote back "You say you are not a master but you must be a practical seaman. I can always detect the hand of an amateur." He was almost correct. She was familiar with life at sea as few armchair amateur would ever be. It was only when she was well established that she started routinely using the by-line "Miss C. Fox Smith" or "Cicely Fox Smith."

Smith initially had her poetry published in a variety of magazines and newspapers: Blackwood's Magazine, Blue Peter, Canada Monthly, Country Life, Cunard Magazine, Daily Chronicle, Grand Magazine, Holly Leaves, the Outlook, Pall Mall Gazette, The Daily Mail, The Dolphin, The London Mercury, The Nautical Magazine, The Spectator, The Sphere, The Times Literary Supplement, Westminster Gazette, White Star Magazine, The Windsor Magazine, The Week and The Daily Colonist (BC) and Punch for which she wrote many poems between 1914 and her death in 1954. She later re-published much of this poetry in her many books. In all, with the new edition, she published well over 660 poems.

In June 2012, the first edition of The Complete Poetry of Cicely Fox Smith, edited by Charles Ipcar (US) and James Saville (UK), was published by Little Red Tree Publishing in the US, and contained all the poems known at that time. The second edition (2015) added 74 new poems, some published for the first time, thanks to the work of numerous researchers around the world, including Jake Wade and Danny McLeod. Included in the second edition is an important introduction by Marcia Phillips McGowan, PhD, (Distinguished Professor Emerita of English, Eastern Connecticut State University), in which she reclaims Cicely Fox Smith in the continuum of important women poets of the early 20 century.

== Later life ==
Other books by Smith included three romantic novels, numerous short stories and articles, as well as several books describing "sailortown." She also published a book of traditional sea shanties that she had collected, and edited a collection of sea poems and stories primarily by other authors. In 1937 Smith finally realised a childhood dream by sailing around the coast of Africa, as a guest of Union-Castle Line, calling at ports along the way. She wrote of her experiences in All the Way Round: Sea Roads to Africa. In the 1940s she began writing children's sea stories with her sister Margaret (Madge) Scott Smith, other travel books, history books, a book about ship models, at least one biography titled Grace Darling, and contributed to and edited many collections.

The fine art work of her older brother Philip Wilson Smith, known at the time for his etchings of Elizabethan architecture and oil paintings, illustrates many of her poetry and prose books.

Her literary outpourings were such as to persuade the Government to award her, at the age of 67, a modest pension for "her services to literature."

Smith kept writing to the end of her life about many things and many places but always with the accuracy and knowledge of an expert. She even chose her own gravestone epitaph, an extract from one of Walter Raleigh's poems:

But from this earth

This grave
This dust
My lord shall raise me up

I trust

Cicely Fox Smith died on 8 April 1954, in Poltimore House Nursing Home, Poltimore, Devon, about 15–20 miles from Bow where she'd been living with her sister Madge.

== Legacy ==
Over 70 of Smith's poems have been adapted for singing and have been recorded, primarily in the nautical folk song tradition.

== Publications ==
Books by C. Fox Smith include:

- A Book of Famous Ships (Houghton Mifflin, New York © 1924)
- A Book of Shanties (traditional sea songs) (Methuen & Co., London © 1927)
- A Sea Chest: an Anthology of Ships and Sailormen (Methuen & Co., London © 1927)
- Adventures and Perils of the Sea (1936)
- All the Way Round: Sea Road to Africa (1938)
- Anchor Lane (1933)
- Ancient Mariners: Some Salt Water Yesterdays (1928)
- Country Days & Country Ways: Trudging Afoot in England (1947)
- Fighting Men (Methuen 1916)
- Full Sail (1926)
- Here and there in England with the Painter Brangwyn (1945)
- Knave-go-by: the Adventures of Jacky Nameless
- Lancashire Hunting Songs, and Other Moorland Lays (J. E. Cornish, Manchester, UK © 1909)
- Men of Men (1901)
- Ocean Racers (1931)
- Painted Ports
- Return of the Cutty Sark (Methuen, 1924)
- Rovings: Sea Songs and Ballads (1921)
- Sailor Town Days (1923)
- Sailor Town: Sea Songs and Ballads (Elkin Mathews, London © 1914 & George H Doran, New York 1919)
- Sailor's Delight (1931)
- Sea Songs and Ballads, 1917–22 (1923)
- Ship Aground: a Tale of Adventure
- Ship Alley: More Sailor Town Days (1925)
- Ship Models (1951)
- Ships and Folks (1920)
- Small Craft: Sailor Ballads and Chantys (Elkin Mathews, London 1917 & George H Doran, New York 1919)
- Songs and Chanties, 1914–1916 (1919)
- Songs in Sail and other Chanties (Elkin Mathews, London 1914)
- Songs of Greater Britain and Other Poems (Sherratt & Hughes, UK 1899)
- Tales of the Clipper Ships (1926)
- Thames Side Yesterdays (1945)
- The City of Hope: A Story of the New West (Sidgewick & Jackson, London 1914)
- The Foremost Trail (Sampson Low, Marston & Co., London © 1899)
- The Naval Crown, Ballads and Songs of the War
- The Thames (1931)
- The Valiant Sailor (with Madge Smith) (1951)
- There Was a Ship: Chapters from the History of Sail (1929)
- Wings of the Morning (Elkin Mathews, London © 1904)
