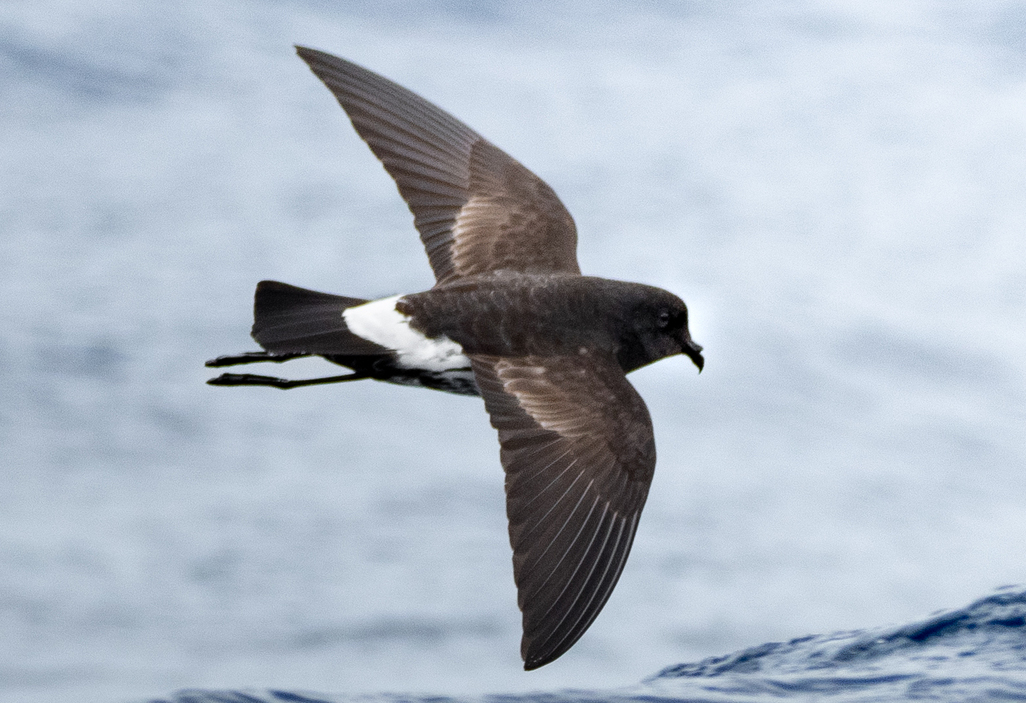

Conservation status
- Critically Endangered (IUCN 3.1)

- Nationally Vulnerable (NZ TCS)

Scientific classification
- Kingdom: Animalia
- Phylum: Chordata
- Class: Aves
- Order: Procellariiformes
- Family: Oceanitidae
- Genus: Fregetta
- Species: F. maoriana

Binomial name
- Fregetta maoriana (Mathews, 1932)
- New Zealand storm petrel range (purple)

Synonyms
- Oceanites maorianus Fregetta maorianus

= New Zealand storm petrel =

Species of bird

The New Zealand storm petrel (Fregetta maoriana) is a small seabird of the family Oceanitidae endemic to New Zealand. Thought to be extinct since 1850, a series of sightings from 2003 to the present indicated the presence of a previously unknown colony. The population of New Zealand storm petrels has been estimated to be less than 2000.

== Description ==
The New Zealand storm petrel is a small seabird, dark brown/black above, except for its white rump. The underparts are black from the throat to the breast, with a white belly that has black streaking, and the feet project well beyond the tail. This storm petrel is strictly nocturnal at the breeding sites to avoid predation by larger and more aggressive gulls and skuas. Like most petrels, its walking ability is limited to a short shuffle to the burrow. It differs from the more common petrel species found in New Zealand, Wilson's storm petrel (O. oceanicus), by its pale bar on the upper wing, white belly with streaking, narrow white panel on the underwings, longer legs, and dark webs to the feet. Outside the breeding season, it is pelagic, remaining at sea, and this, together with its remote breeding sites, makes it a difficult bird to observe.

== Taxonomy ==
The specific epithet honours the Māori, the native people of New Zealand. The New Zealand storm petrel has on occasion been considered a subspecies or even variant of Wilson's storm petrel, but is quite distinct. In 2011, DNA samples from museum specimens in England and France matched those of birds in the Hauraki Gulf. The study also suggested the species is probably more closely related to storm petrels in the genus Fregetta than Oceanites.

== Rediscovery ==
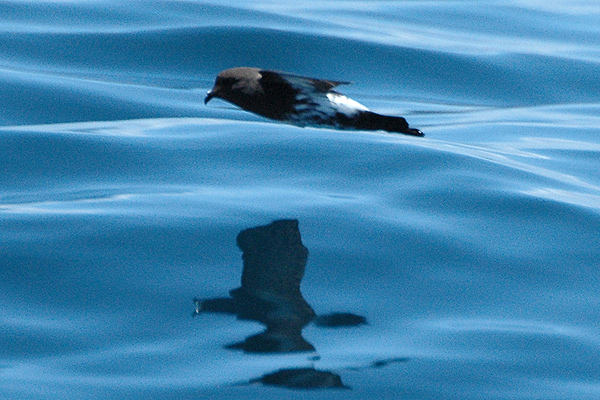
New Zealand storm petrel photographed in Hauraki Gulf, New Zealand

It had been believed to be extinct, but on 25 January 2003, a possible sighting was made by Sav Saville, Brent Stephenson, and others close to the Mercury Islands off the Coromandel Peninsula of New Zealand's North Island, leading to several inconclusive photographs and an article being published. On 17 November 2003, while looking for black-bellied storm petrels and white-faced storm petrels, Bob Flood and Bryan Thomas obtained good photographs and video of 10 to 20 New Zealand storm petrels off Great Barrier and Little Barrier Islands in the Hauraki Gulf. Subsequently, four storm petrels were captured and released in a similar area in late 2005/early 2006, three with radio transmitters attached. Tour operators have also regularly seen these birds on the Hauraki Gulf since this time.

The tagged birds were initially only tracked at sea; efforts to find the birds' breeding location were unsuccessful until 2013, when a breeding site on Little Barrier Island was found. A team of researchers from Auckland University led by Chris Gaskin and Matt Rayner discovered the breeding site in the Hauraki Gulf Marine Park in February 2013. Researchers will continue observing the birds from a distance to prevent disturbing the breeding cycle. They hope to establish the distribution and population of the remaining New Zealand storm petrels. In February 2014, an egg of the New Zealand storm petrel on Little Barrier Island was first discovered. It measured 31 mm by 23 mm and was coloured white with a fine dusting of pink spots concentrated at one end.
