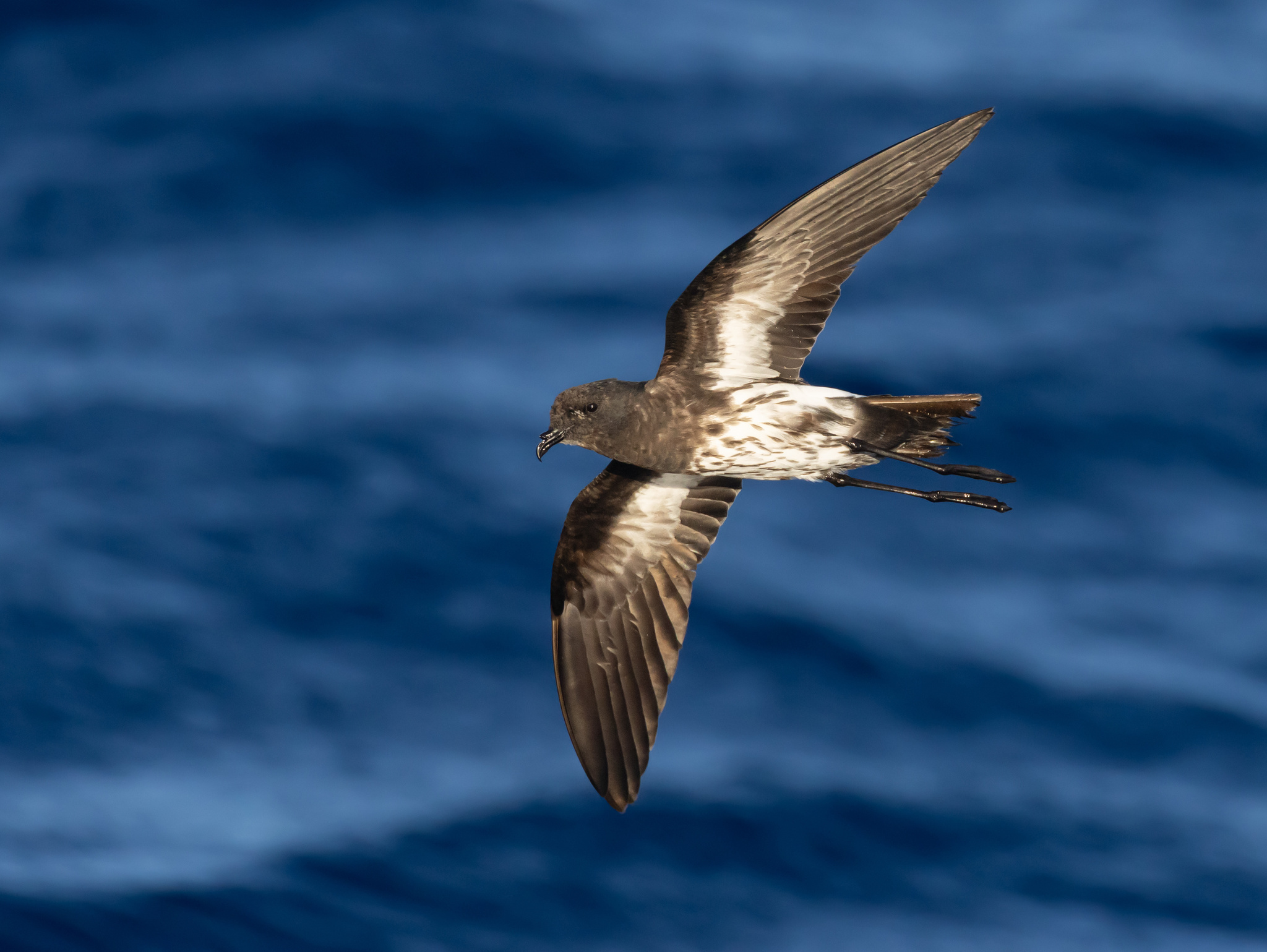

Conservation status
- Data Deficient (IUCN 3.1)

Scientific classification
- Kingdom: Animalia
- Phylum: Chordata
- Class: Aves
- Order: Procellariiformes
- Family: Oceanitidae
- Genus: Fregetta
- Species: F. lineata

Binomial name
- Fregetta lineata (Peale, 1849)

Synonyms
- Pealea lineata (Ridgway, 1886)

= New Caledonian storm petrel =

Species of bird

The New Caledonian storm petrel (Fregetta lineata) is a species of bird in the family Oceanitidae.

== Taxonomy ==
The New Caledonian storm petrel was formally described in 1849 by the American naturalist Titian Peale under the binomial name Thalassidroma lineata. The specific epithet is Latin meaning "marked with lines".

The New Caledonian storm petrel, alongside the closely related New Zealand storm petrel (F. maoriana) which shares a similar streaked coloration, was long thought to merely be an aberrant member of another storm petrel species. The recognition of the New Zealand storm petrel as a valid species prompted a reevaluation of the New Caledonian storm petrel, and it was thus revived as a distinct species in 2022. It is thought to be critically endangered, with an adult population of only 100 - 1,000 pairs.

== Distribution and habitat ==
It is an endemic breeder to New Caledonia, and has a wider nonbreeding range throughout the Coral Sea and the South Pacific, as far east as the Marquesas.

At-sea observations continue to occur of the east coast of Australia, however the location of a breeding colony is yet to be discovered. On 26 September 2014, a juvenile F. lineata was discovered on the shore of mainland New Caledonia, in an inhabited area. The photographs were first sent to Ludovic Renaudet (of the Caledonian Ornithological Society), who forwarded them to Vincent Bretagnolle for identification. This is the only definite record of F. lineata on land and indicates a likely nearby breeding location.
