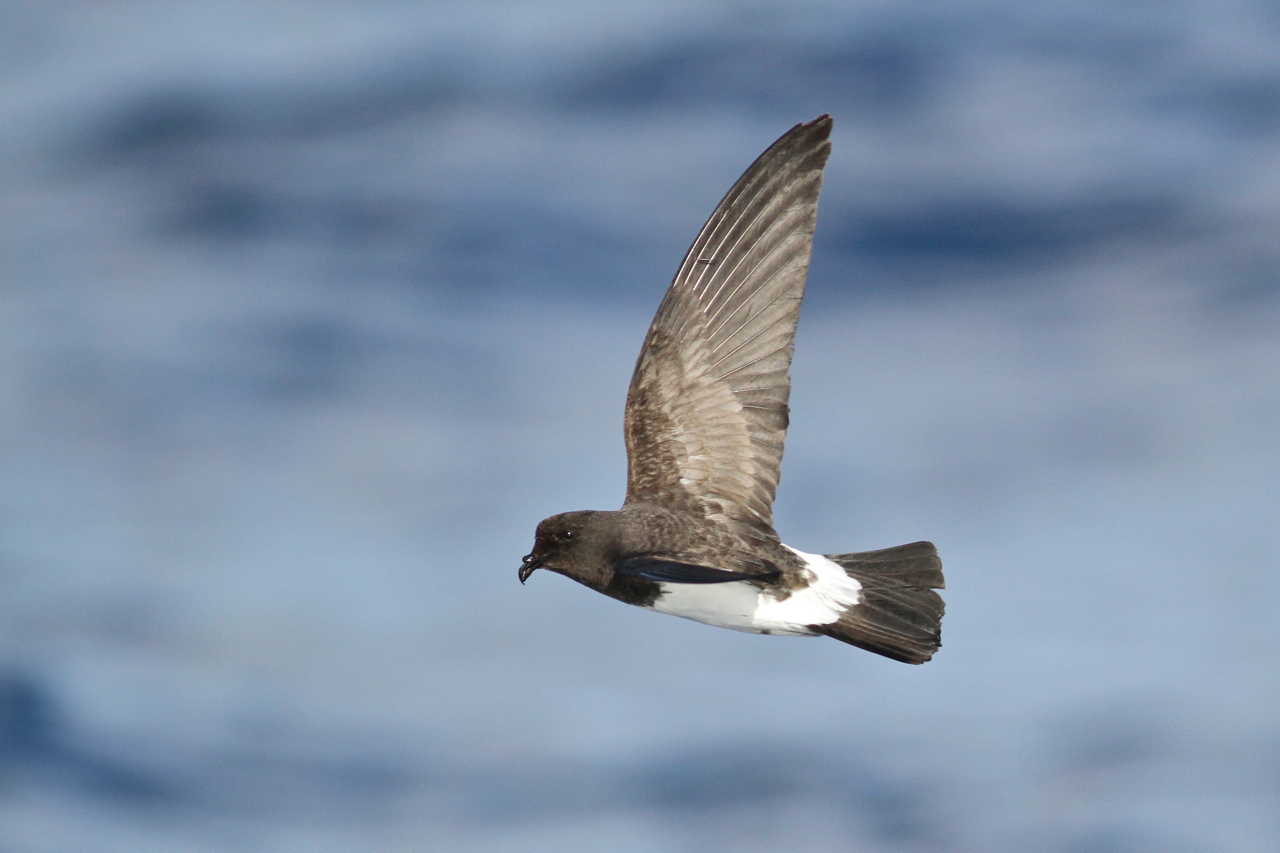
- White-bellied storm petrel at Lord Howe Island

Scientific classification
- Domain: Eukaryota
- Kingdom: Animalia
- Phylum: Chordata
- Class: Aves
- Order: Procellariiformes
- Family: Oceanitidae
- Genus: Fregetta; Bonaparte, 1855

Type species
- Thalasssidroma leucogaster (white-bellied storm petrel) Gould, 1844

Species
- Fregetta grallaria; Fregetta lineata; Fregetta maoriana; Fregetta tropica

Synonyms
- Cymodroma Ridgway, 1884 Pealea Ridgway, 1886 Fregettornis Mathews, 1912 Fregodroma Mathews, 1937 Fregolla Mathews, 1937 Fregandria Mathews, 1938 nomen novum for Fregolla Mathews, 1937

= Fregetta =

Genus of birds

Fregetta is a seabird genus in the austral storm petrel family Oceanitidae.

== Taxonomy ==
The genus Fregetta was introduced in 1855 by the French naturalist Charles Lucien Bonaparte. He specified the type species as Thalasssidroma leucogaster which is now considered as a subspecies of the white-bellied storm petrel.

The genus contains four species:

- White-bellied storm petrel, Fregetta grallaria
- Black-bellied storm petrel, Fregetta tropica
- New Zealand storm petrel, Fregetta maoriana – formerly placed in Oceanites
- New Caledonian storm petrel, Fregetta lineata – revived as a distinct species in 2022
