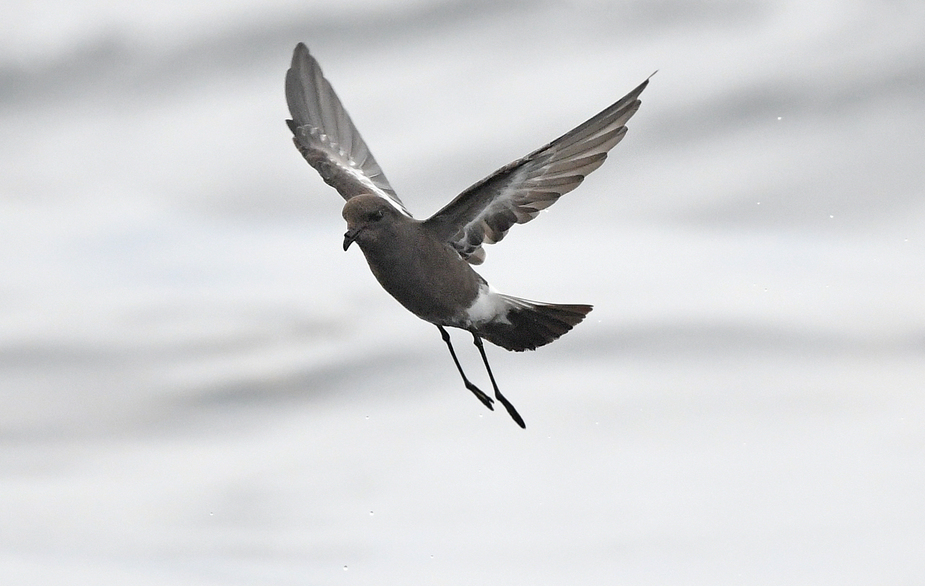

Conservation status
- Data Deficient (IUCN 3.1)

Scientific classification
- Kingdom: Animalia
- Phylum: Chordata
- Class: Aves
- Order: Procellariiformes
- Family: Oceanitidae
- Genus: Oceanites
- Species: O. pincoyae

Binomial name
- Oceanites pincoyae Harrison et al., 2013

= Pincoya storm petrel =

Species of bird

The Pincoya storm petrel (Oceanites pincoyae) is a sea bird of the storm petrel family. The specific name commemorates the Pincoya, a female water spirit of the Chilote mythology. After being first brought to the world's attention through photographs taken by Seamus Enright and Michael O'Keeffe in 2009, this species was formally discovered and examined in 2011 and scientifically described in 2013. It was originally only known from waters near Chiloé Island, Chile, specifically Reloncavi Sound and the Chacao Channel, but in 2021, one was photographed in the Benguela Current off the coast of Cape Town, South Africa

== Description ==
The holotype, a female, which was captured, examined, and released afterwards on 19 February 2011 has the following measurements: head and bill length 32.9 mm, exposed culmen length 11.5 mm, bill length from gape 12 mm, flattened wing length from chord 134 mm, tarsus length 31 mm, mid-toe length (with claws) 26.5 mm, tail length 57 mm, wing span 330 mm and a mass of 24 g. Two paratypes, a juvenile female and a male which were originally identified as Wilson's storm petrels (Oceanites oceanicus) and collected by Argentinian ornithologist Andor Kovács at El Bolsón, Argentina in 1972 and 1983 have the following measurements: the wing length of the juvenile female is 138 mm, the tail length 61 mm, the tarsus length 31.5 mm, the culmen length is 9.5 mm, the mid-toe length is 26 mm, the wing length of the male is 137 mm, the tail length is 53 mm, the tarsus length 30.5 mm, the exposed culmen length is 10 mm and the mid-toe length is 27 mm.

The head, mantle, scapulars, back and upper rump are blackish-brown. The nape, mantle and scapulars, back and upper rump are washed silvery-gray. Some scapulars and the longest tertials have narrow but distinct white edges.
