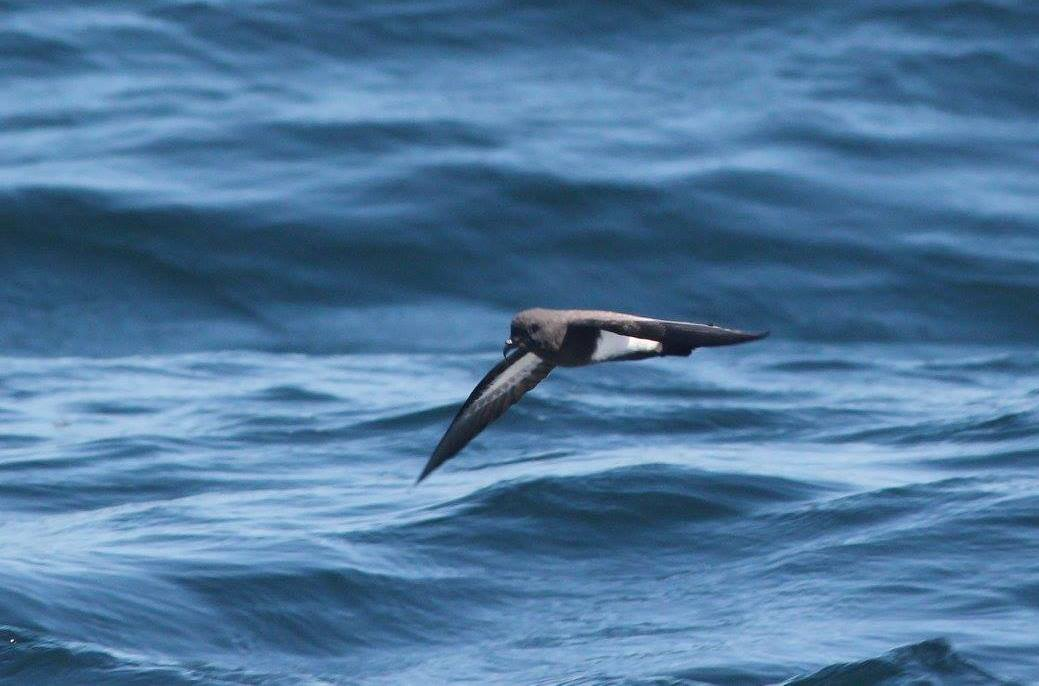
- Near Cape Town, South Africa
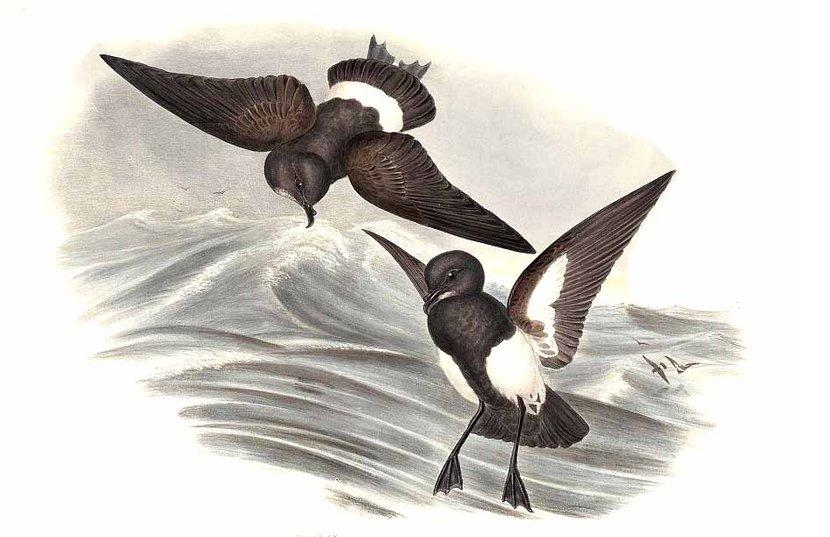
- Illustration by John Gould

Conservation status
- Least Concern (IUCN 3.1)

Scientific classification
- Kingdom: Animalia
- Phylum: Chordata
- Class: Aves
- Order: Procellariiformes
- Family: Oceanitidae
- Genus: Fregetta
- Species: F. tropica

Binomial name
- Fregetta tropica (Gould, 1844)
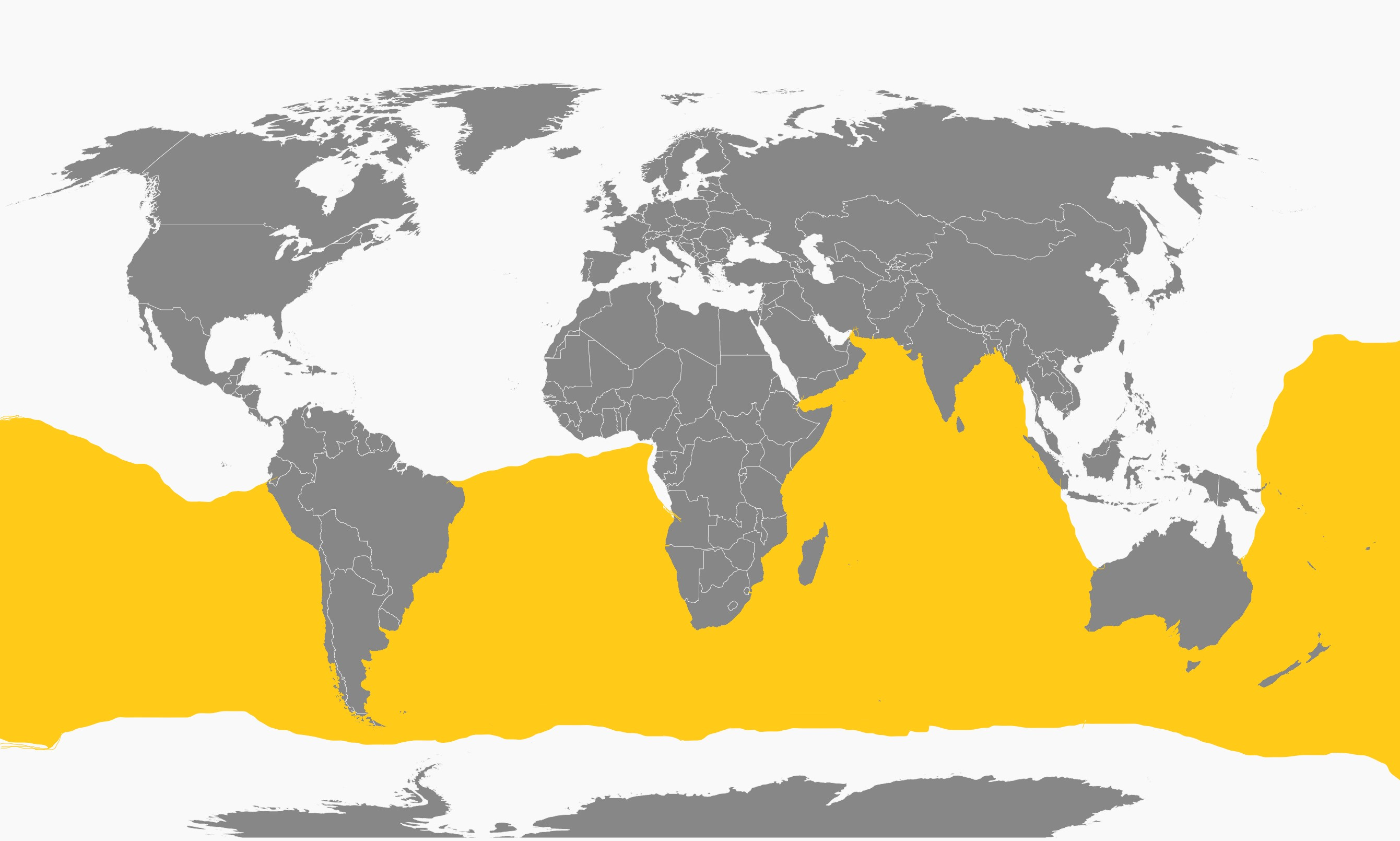

= Black-bellied storm petrel =

Species of bird

The black-bellied storm petrel (Fregetta tropica) is a species of seabird in the family Oceanitidae. This species is found only in the southern part of the Southern Hemisphere, where it has a circumpolar distribution.

== Taxonomy and systematics ==
The black-bellied storm petrel was officially discovered and named by the English ornithologist and publisher John Gould in 1844, in the Annals and Magazine of Natural History (now Journal of Natural History). The bird was initially placed in the genus Thalassidroma in 1844 before being reclassified into the genus Fregetta by the French naturalist Charles Lucien Bonaparte in 1885.

Its scientific name means the "little frigate of the tropics", from fregata-, meaning an English frigate (a fast, small warship) and the latin word tropicus, meaning tropical or of the tropical regions.

=== Subspecies ===
Two subspecies are currently accepted:

- F. t. tropica (Gould, 1844): from the islands of the Scotia Arc, across the southern Indian Ocean, to the Antipodes Islands.
- F. t. melanoleuca (Salvadori, 1908): found on Tristan da Cunha and Gough Island. This subspecies sometimes has a partially or entirely white central belly area.

Historical confusion regarding the subspecies F. t. melanoleuca led some authors to merge it with white-bellied storm petrel (F. grallaria) or to consider it invalid. Despite the counter-intuitive presence of a white belly, a genetic study published in Molecular Phylogenetics and Evolution clarified its status. Using DNA sequencing, researchers demonstrated that F. t. melanoleuca is a genetically distinct population with limited divergence from the subspecies F. t. tropica, thereby confirming its true phylogenetic affinity with the black-bellied storm petrel.

== Description ==
They are usually black with a white band over the rump and white under the wings and on the flanks. A broad black stripe runs down the center of the belly, but may be broken or absent altogether. They have long legs, so the feet can be seen beyond the tail in flight. The legs and feet are black. The adult measures ≈ 20 cm in length, has a wingspan of 43 to 46 cm, and weighs approximately 43 to 63 g.

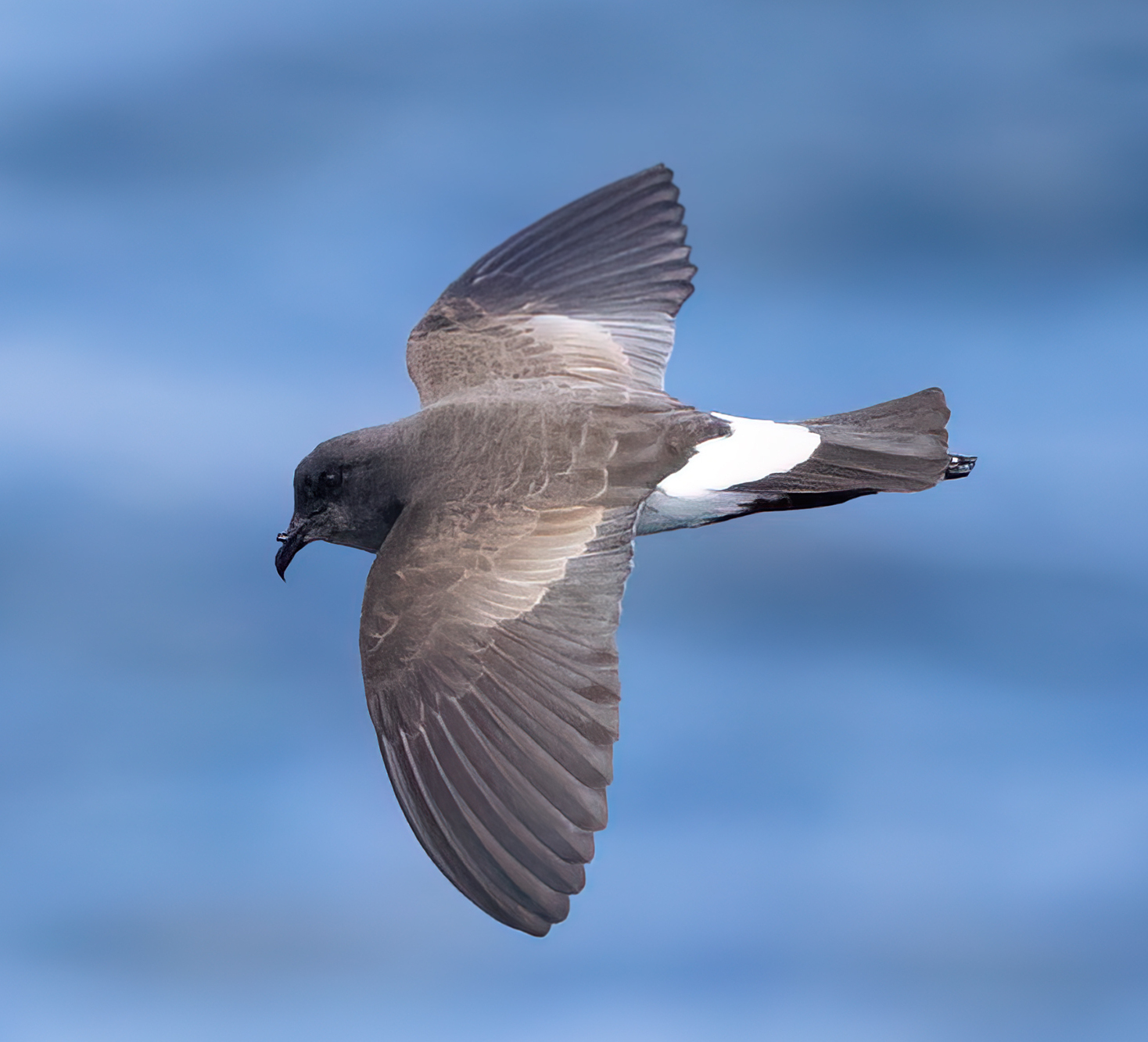
Flying black-bellied storm petrel

This bird has a distinctive way of flying; it slaps its belly against the water and changes direction by kicking its feet. Furthermore, all members of the genus Fregetta feed in an unusual manner, bouncing off the waves using a single foot in an asymmetrical bounding motion.

The black-bellied storm petrel and the white-bellied storm petrel (Fregetta grallaria) are closely related. In addition to the differing colours, the black-bellied storm petrel has longer legs, and prefers a more southern, colder habitat.

== Habitat and Distribution ==
The black-bellied storm petrel inhabits cold sub-Antarctic seas. Some individuals migrate further north in winter (generally from May to August).

Its global population was estimated at approximately 500,000 individuals in 2004.

Dorsal view

Ventral view

Lateral view

The black-bellied storm petrel has a large range and can be found across Antarctica, Argentina, Australia, Bouvet Island, Brazil, Chile, Falkland Islands, French Polynesia, French Southern Territories, Madagascar, Mozambique, New Zealand, Oman, Peru, Saint Helena, São Tomé and Príncipe, Solomon Islands, South Africa, South Georgia and the South Sandwich Islands, Uruguay, and Vanuatu.

A single specimen was captured in 1840 or 1841 by John Gilbert in the Northern Territory. It was a vagrant individual and represents the first (and only) record in northern waters.

== Behaviour and ecology ==
=== Vocalizations ===
They are silent mostly at sea. Noises can be heard from the breeding colonies; birds on the ground give a drawn-out shrill whistle.

=== Reproduction ===
The black-bellied storm petrel engages in courtship displays that take the form of aerial chases, during which the birds fly rapidly in circles above the nesting site while calling out. The partners then engage in mutual preening and touch their beaks together inside the burrow. Finally, mating occurs within the nesting chamber. They build their nests in cavities among loose rocks, or in burrows dug into the ground and peat.

Females lay a single egg per clutch in the nest (a burrow or natural cavity) during the months of December or January, and the egg is around 26 % of the body weight of the female. Both parents then take turns guarding the egg with alternate spells of three days (shared incubation behaviour), and incubation lasts from 35 to 45 days. The egg is "dull white with a few dull reddish-brown markings at the larger end", measuring approximately 37 mm in length and 27 mm in width. Upon hatching, the chick is altricial (meaning it is very fragile and immature, requiring intensive parental care before it can leave the nest). The chick is covered in pale gray down and is fed once a day by its parents. The nestling period lasts 65 to 70 days, which is also the age at which the young bird fledges.

After the breeding season, black-bellied storm petrels migrate to tropical and subtropical seas, moving further north in May and June, and returning south in October and November.

These birds are monogamous and form long-lasting pairs, sometimes returning to occupy the same burrow year after year. They nest in colonies and lead a nocturnal lifestyle, while also defending a territory around the entrance to their nest. When they feel threatened, they may eject the contents of their stomachs onto intruders or predators.

=== Diet ===
Foraging bird off the Gold Coast, Queensland

The Black-bellied Storm Petrel is a highly pelagic bird that feed near or beyond the continental shelf in a wide range of water temperatures, from 0 to 30 °C. It feeds while in flight, capturing prey from the surface or by making shallow dives from the air. Its a carnivorous/piscivorous marine predator, whose diet consists of a wide variety of small animals, including crustaceans, squid, and small fish. They are sometimes observed in association with orcas or other large cetaceans, and may also be found near longline fishing vessels.

=== Threats ===
The species is threatened by invasive predators introduced to its breeding islands, such as mice, rats, and cats. For example, in New Zealand’s Auckland Islands, the black-bellied storm petrels that once bred on Campbell Island and the main island of the Auckland archipelago have likely been wiped out by brown rats and cats. A population decline is suspected, although the species is classified as Least Concern by the IUCN.

Its natural avian predators include skuas and owls.

Humans are the source of several dangers to the species. Some petrels can perish as a result of collisions with boats, probably attracted by the light. Moreover, lights from coastal areas and ships can disorient birds. Also, oil pollution incidents can pose an important threat to the species, which may mistake the oil for the traces of oil left by fish or whales (traces that typically help the animals locate food).

The impact of plastic pollution on the black-bellied storm petrel represents a significant and growing ecological threat, as these small pelagic birds are particularly vulnerable to plastic debris (whether macroplastics or microplastics) due to their specialized feeding behaviors, their anatomy, and their extensive range across the Southern Hemisphere. Birds mistake small fragments of plastic for food, or ingest plastic that has already been consumed by their prey. This can lead to injuries, poisoning, and starvation. Petrels are particularly vulnerable, as they cannot easily regurgitate plastic, and macroplastics then accumulate in the stomach, creating a false sense of satiety that reduces the urge to feed and leads directly to starvation and malnutrition. Furthermore, during the breeding season, adults often inadvertently feed plastic to their chicks, which are even more vulnerable to internal physical damage (such as stomach perforation) and their chances of survival are reduced due to these obstructions (because the plastic present in their stomachs prevents them from consuming a full meal). Additional danger, plastics can also contain toxic chemicals that can be harmful to seabirds. Large plastic debris, such as abandoned fishing gear and plastic lines, can also affect birds by posing an entanglement risk, which may lead to injuries, drowning, or an inability to fly. On a much smaller size, small particles (microplastics and nanoplastics; < 1 mm) are likely to cause negative effects, as they can enter the bloodstream, the placenta, and various organs, where they may disrupt regulatory mechanisms.

Climate change is having and will have an increasingly significant impact in the coming decades, notably by disrupting the marine food web. The black-bellied storm petrel feeds at the water's surface on fish, squid, and crustaceans (particularly krill). However, the warming of southern waters is directly altering the distribution of zooplankton. Nutrient-rich areas are shifting further away, forcing the birds to undertake much longer journeys, which reduces the survival rate of adults and the frequency with which they feed their young. This can lead to large-scale reproductive failure or mass mortality (die-offs) during the winter. A second factor influenced by global warming is the rise in ocean surface temperatures, which fuels more frequent and destructive storms and cyclones. These storms weaken the species and can cause significant harm to the overall population. Thirdly, climate change can alter the composition and structure of vegetation within seabird colonies (a phenomenon referred to as "climatic migration"). When climate change affects local temperatures, precipitation patterns, or the frequency of storms, it can transform the original plant structure. Black-bellied storm-petrel colonies are closely linked to their terrestrial habitats, and a shift away from established native vegetation can compromise soil stability and make burrows more vulnerable to collapse or erosion from heavy rainfall.

== Relationship to humans ==
Various superstitions have surrounded petrels in general, and not just the black-bellied storm petrel.

English-speaking sailors traditionally nicknamed the storm-petrel birds "Mother Carey’s chickens". The origin of this name is not clear. It could be a corruption of the Latin phrase "Mater Cara" (Dear Mother), referring to the Virgin Mary. Sailors believed that the birds' sudden appearance around their ships served as a divine warning, signaling the imminent arrival of a violent storm, and that the birds where sent by Mary to protect them. However, other people considered these birds to be a bad omen (because of the storm which would follow them). They called them "Mother Carey's chickens", but also "satanites", "water witches", or even "birds of the devil" due to their ability to survive in the heart of the worst ocean storms. Some legends associate it with a mythical sea witch who would summon storms and cause shipwrecks, and who either kept petrels as servants or would even transform herself into a petrel (hence the name Mother Carey's chickens).

The word "petrel" may be derived from the name of Saint Peter. This term refers to the bird's habit of flying just above the waves while paddling its feet for stability, creating the magical illusion that it is walking on water (like Saint Peter). It may also be derived from the word "pitteral," which means "walking elegantly", from the way these birds appear to walk on the water while searching for food. In slang, the term "stormy petrel" refers to a person who brings about change, seeks out conflict, or heralds upheaval.

Moreover, in maritime folklore, killing a petrel was considered to bring extreme misfortune. Sailors believed that these elusive birds harbored the souls of mariners who had drowned at sea, condemned to wander eternally above the waters that had swallowed them up. This idea emerged from their spectral presence and supernatural ability to skim across the waves before vanishing into the mist.

Ultimately, the presence of petrels during bad weather testifies to their adaptations for life at sea, as these birds face challenging marine conditions on a daily basis. They fly just above the water’s surface, using their wings to generate lift and their feet to maintain balance. By staying close to waves and ships, they find a degree of shelter from the most intense turbulence of a storm. Thus, their appearance during storms is not a mystical omen, but rather a response to their environment, illustrating their resilience and capacity for survival.

== Status ==
Although the species is classified globally as "Least Concern" by the IUCN, human activities have a tangible impact on its survival, and a population decline is suspected. As mentioned in the "Threats" section, the bird is threatened by the introduction of predators (rats, cats, mices), pollution (such as oil pollution), light pollution, and climate change.
