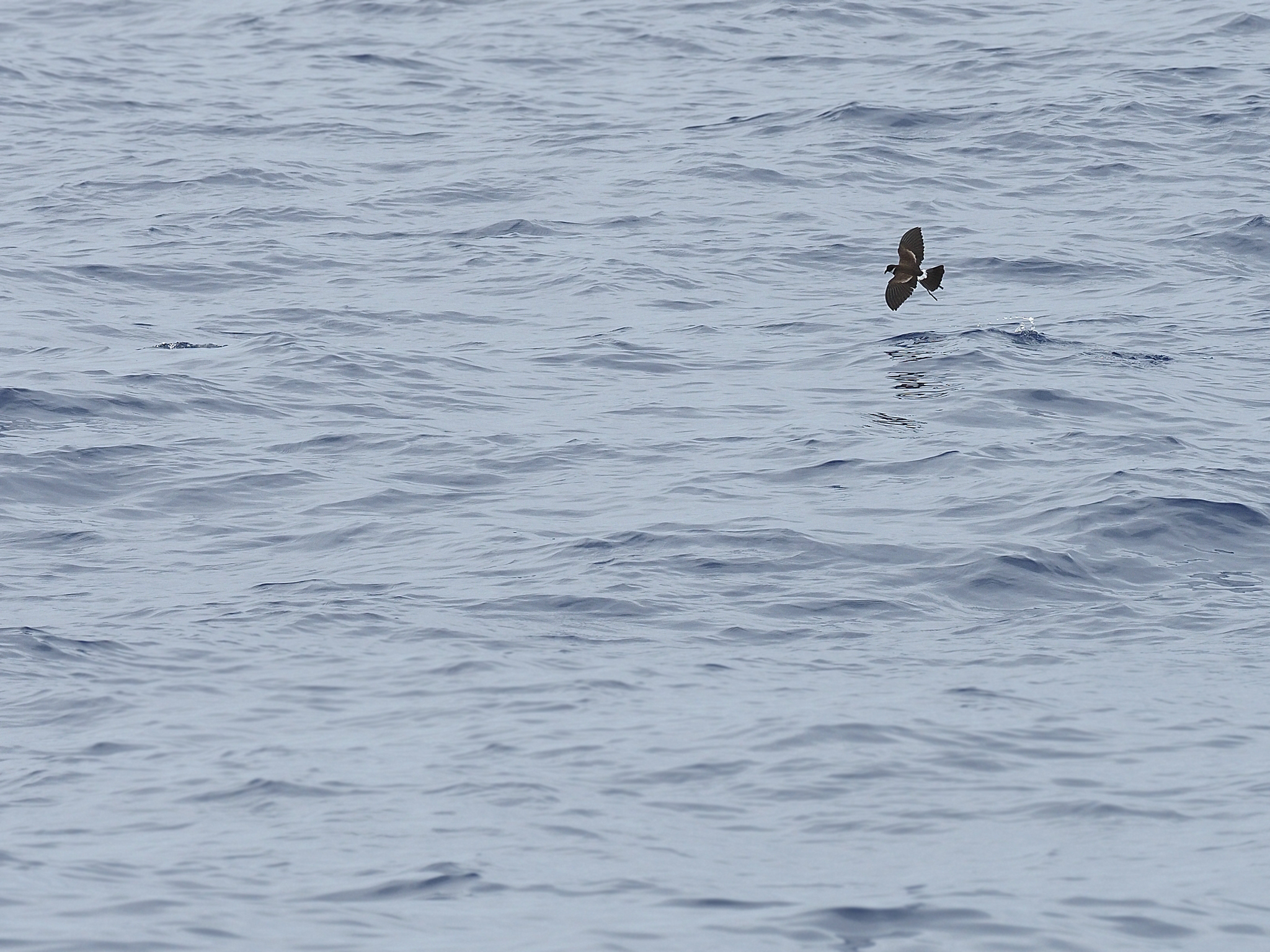

Conservation status
- Endangered (IUCN 3.1)

Scientific classification
- Kingdom: Animalia
- Phylum: Chordata
- Class: Aves
- Order: Procellariiformes
- Family: Oceanitidae
- Genus: Nesofregetta; Mathews, 1912
- Species: N. fuliginosa

Binomial name
- Nesofregetta fuliginosa (Gmelin, JF, 1789)
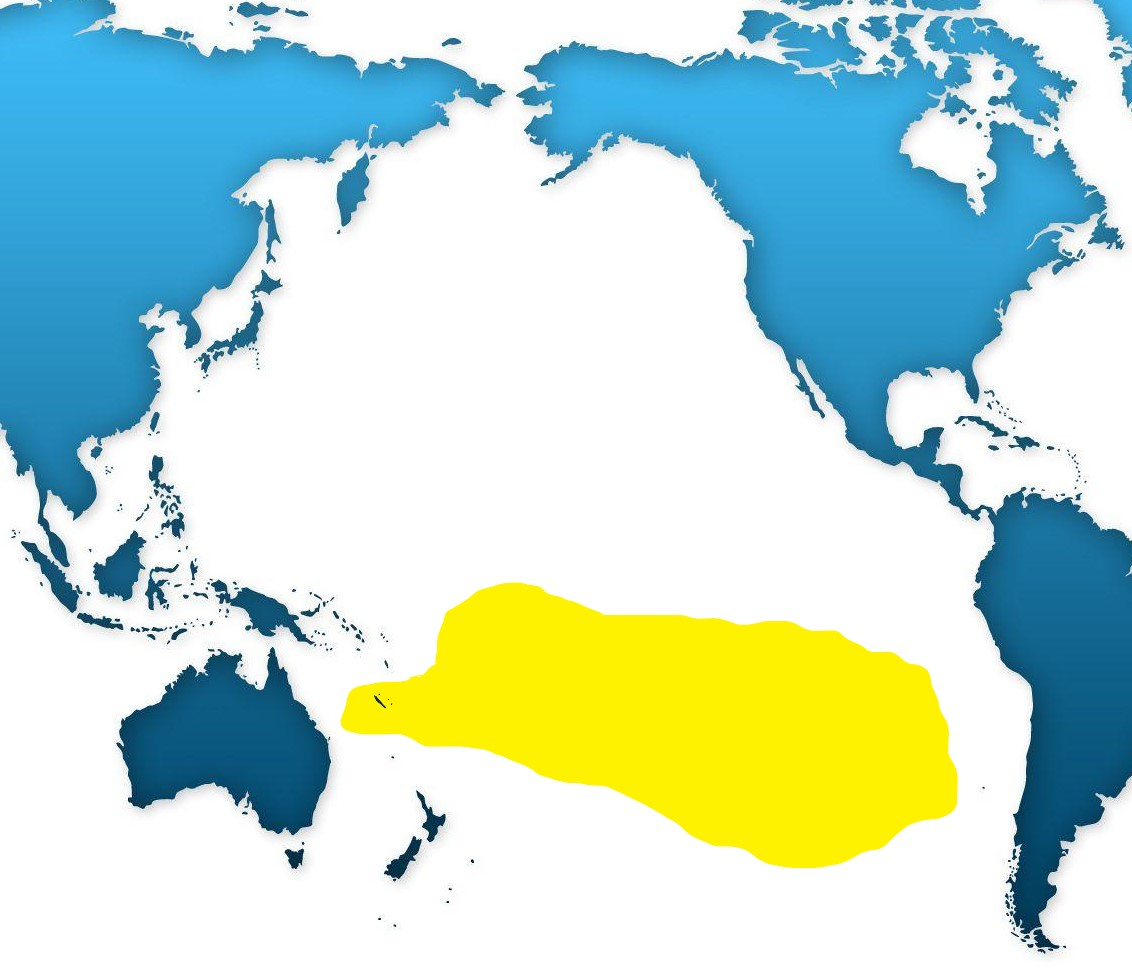
- Range map

Synonyms
- Fregetta ampitrite Jardin, 1859; Procellaria albigularis Finsch, 1878; Fregetta moestissima Salvin, 1879

= Polynesian storm petrel =

Species of bird

The Polynesian storm petrel (Nesofregetta fuliginosa) is a species of seabird in the family Oceanitidae. It is the only species placed in the genus Nesofregetta. This species is markedly polymorphic, consisting of several subspecies. At one time the light-colored variety were even considered a species on their own (white-throated storm-petrel). However, subspecies are not generally accepted today.

Polynesian Storm-petrels can weigh anywhere from 56–86 g (2.0–3.0 oz) and can be as tall as 10.2 inches (260 mm). They are identifiable by their black bills, broad, round wings, and black feet. Some of the Polynesian Storm-petrels vary in regards to the white on their stomach, but can be identifiable through that as well. They can also be identified through their zig-zag flight patterns and their forked tail. Polynesian Storm-petrels nest in burrows they create on their nesting islands. The burrows are typically around vegetation or in rock crevices. The Polynesian Storm-petrel's natural habitats are open seas, rocky shores, and sandy shores.

== Taxonomy ==
The Polynesian storm petrel was formally described in 1789 by the German naturalist Johann Friedrich Gmelin in his revised and expanded edition of Carl Linnaeus's Systema Naturae. He placed it with the other petrels in the genus Procellaria and coined the binomial name Procellaria fuliginosa. Gmelin based his description on the "sooty petrel" that had been described in 1785 by the English ornithologist John Latham in his book A General Synopsis of Birds. The Polynesian storm petrel is now the only species placed in the genus Nesofregetta that was introduced in 1912 by the Australian born ornithologist Gregory Mathews. The name combines the Ancient Greek nēsos meaning "island" and Fregetta, a genus name that was introduced by Charles Lucien Bonaparte in 1855 for the storm petrels. The specific epithet fuliginosa is from Late Latin fuliginosus meaning "sooty". The species is monotypic: no subspecies are recognised.

== Distribution ==
Polynesian Storm-petrels can be found in Chile, French Polynesia, Kiribati, New Caledonia, Vanuatu, American Samoa, Fiji, and Samoa.

== Biology ==
Generally, Polynesian Storm-petrels have a carnivorous diet. Their diet mainly consists of cephalopods, fish, and crustaceans. They mainly hunt for food when they are in flight by diving into the water.

=== Breeding ===
Polynesian Storm-petrels will generally breed on coral or volcanic islands in colonies. Most members of the colony arrive at night after foraging throughout the day. They mainly stay on their island, which points towards a sedentary lifestyle.

Depending on the distance from the equator, Polynesian Storm-petrels might lay eggs seasonally or non-seasonally; the closer they are to the equator, the less likely they are to lay eggs seasonally. Polynesian Storm-petrels lay single eggs and it takes about 50 days to hatch. The fledging age is about 60 days after hatching. Until they fledge, young Polynesian Storm-petrels are fed and protected by both parents.

== Threats ==
The main threats to Polynesian Storm-petrels include introduced species like rats and cats. Loss of eggs and chicks to predation by house mice is also a threat, along with loss of vegetation due to agriculture and rabbits.

Sea level rise as a result of global climate change has affected Polynesian Storm-petrel's habitat. Vegetation and grass can get washed out due to overly aggressive storms, which can destroy critical breeding areas. Climate change also results in heavier rainfall, which then results in increased groundwater salinity.

== Conservation efforts ==
Some of the conservation efforts for the Polynesian Storm-petrel include monitoring breeding populations and invasive species in specific areas, restoration of former breeding islands, and using translocations and social attraction to restore populations.

A few of the efforts from the past, starting from 1990 includes predator removal, biosecurity plans, and compliance and education.
