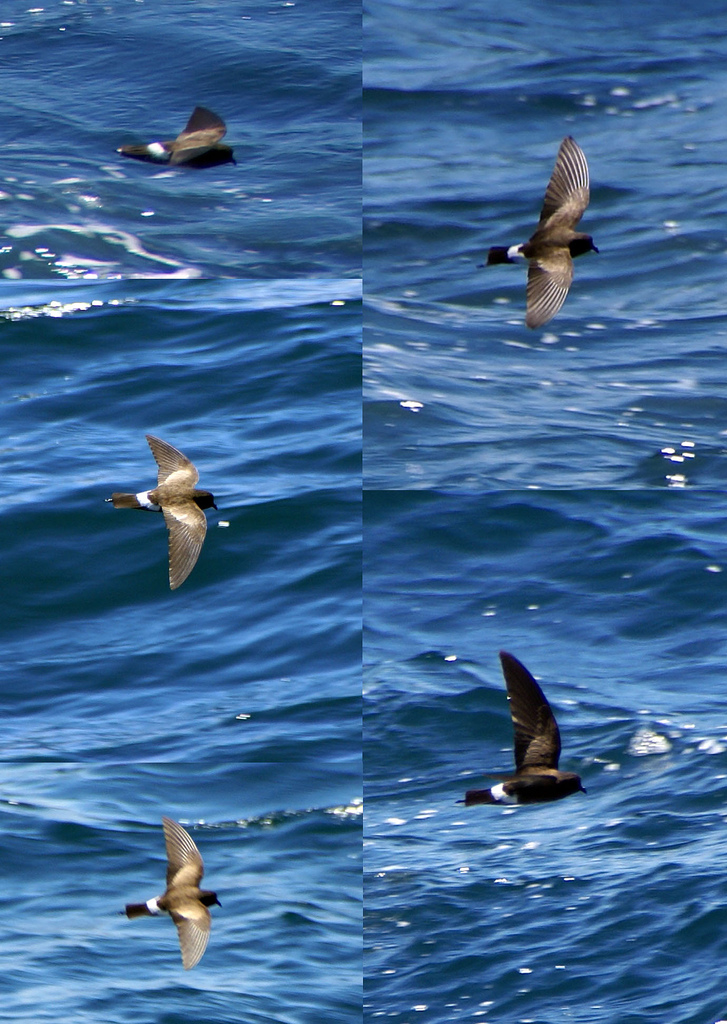
- O. g. galapagoensis

Conservation status
- Data Deficient (IUCN 3.1)

Scientific classification
- Kingdom: Animalia
- Phylum: Chordata
- Class: Aves
- Order: Procellariiformes
- Family: Oceanitidae
- Genus: Oceanites
- Species: O. gracilis

Binomial name
- Oceanites gracilis (Elliot, 1859)
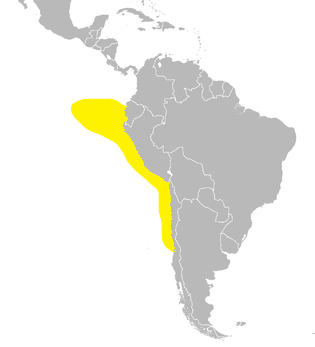

= Elliot's storm petrel =

Species of bird

Elliot's storm petrel (Oceanites gracilis) is a species of seabird in the storm petrel family Oceanitidae. The species is also known as the white-vented storm petrel. There are two subspecies, O. g. gracilis, which is found in the Humboldt Current off Peru and Chile, and O. g. galapagoensis, which is found in the waters around the Galápagos Islands. It is a sooty-black storm petrel with a white rump and a white band crossing the lower belly and extending up the midline of the belly. It has long legs which extend beyond the body in flight.

== Distribution ==
In spite of the frequent sightings of this species it is very poorly known. Despite considerable research, only one nest had ever been found prior to 2003, that being on the Isla Chungungo, off the coast of Chile. During a survey in 2002, about eleven nests were found in three crevices on this island, but it was also being used by nesting Humboldt penguins (Spheniscus humboldti) and there seemed to be very few suitable sites for the petrels to nest. Another possible breeding site may be inland in the Atacama Desert; a mummified chick, verified by DNA analysis, has been found in a crevice here, and signs of former activities in various cavities, but no live bird has been seen despite searches at various times of the year. It seems likely that there are some breeding colonies in Peru, because the bird is quite common off the coast out at sea. The population around the Galápagos Islands seems to be a resident and likely to be breeding, but again, no nesting site is known. The feeding behaviour of the Galápagos subspecies is unusual amongst storm-petrels as it forages close to shore; all other storm-petrels are exclusively pelagic.
