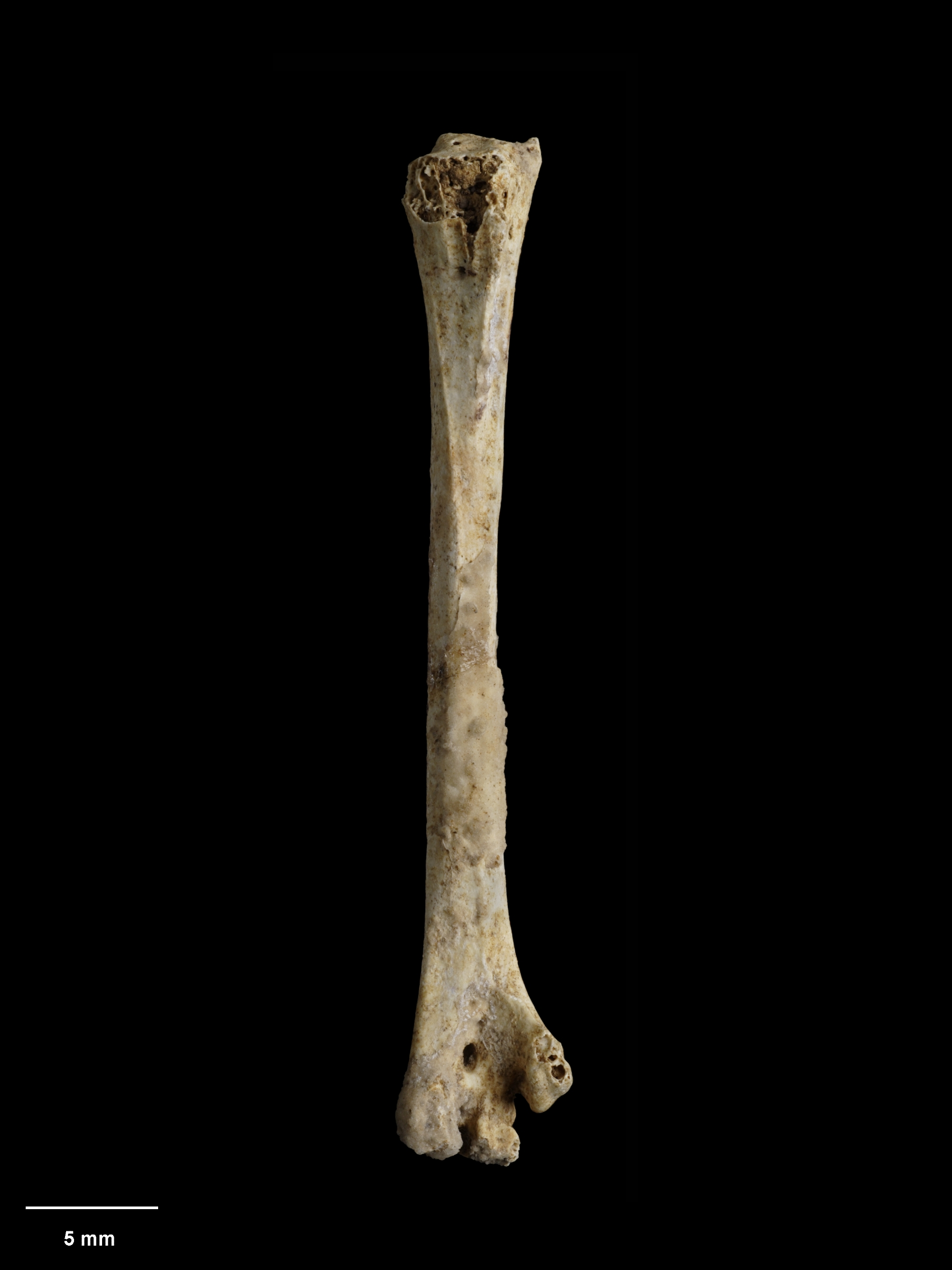
- Bone of holotype specimen of Gallirallus huiatua, collected from Anakuli Cave, Niue by Trevor Worthy

Conservation status
- Extinct

Scientific classification
- Kingdom: Animalia
- Phylum: Chordata
- Class: Aves
- Order: Gruiformes
- Family: Rallidae
- Genus: Gallirallus
- Species: †G. huiatua

Binomial name
- †Gallirallus huiatua Steadman, Worthy, Anderson & Walter, 2000

= Niue rail =

Niue rail Temporal range: Late Holocene

Extinct species of bird

The Niue rail (Gallirallus huiatua) is an extinct species of flightless bird in the Rallidae, or rail family.

== History ==
The rail was described in 2000 from subfossil bones collected in January 1995 by paleozoologist Trevor Worthy at the Anakuli cave site in Hakupu village, on the island of Niue in West Polynesia. The age range of about 5300 to 3600 year BP for fossil material collected from the site predates human settlement of the island.

== Etymology ==
The specific epithet comes from the Niuean words hui (bones) and atua (of the dead).

== See also ==
- List of birds of Niue
