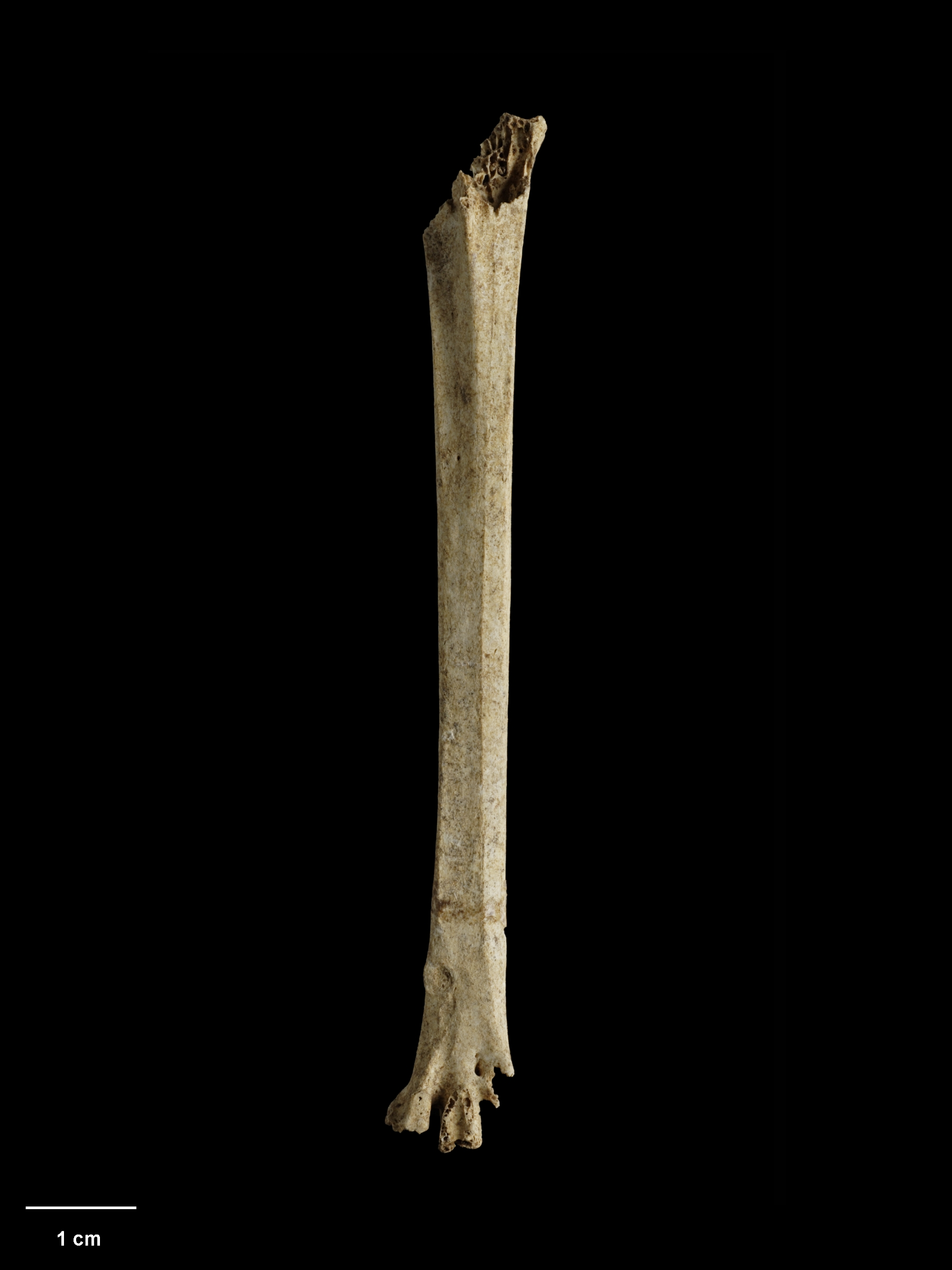
- Bone of holotype Nycticorax kalavikai, collected at Anakuli Cave, Niue by Trevor Worthy.

Scientific classification
- Kingdom: Animalia
- Phylum: Chordata
- Class: Aves
- Order: Pelecaniformes
- Family: Ardeidae
- Genus: Nycticorax
- Species: N. kalavikai

Binomial name
- Nycticorax kalavikai Steadman, Worthy, Anderson & Walter, 2000

= Niue night heron =

Niue night heron Temporal range: Late Holocene

Extinct species of bird

The Niue night heron (Nycticorax kalavikai) is an extinct night heron species that was endemic to the island of Niue in West Polynesia.

== History ==
The night heron was described in 2000 from subfossil bones collected in January 1995 by paleozoologist Trevor Worthy at the Anakuli cave site in Hakupu village. The age range of about 5300 to 3600 year BP for fossil material collected from the site predates human settlement of the island.

== Etymology ==
The specific epithet comes from the Niuean words kalavi (land crab) and kai (food), alluding to speculation by the describers that land crabs constituted an important part of the species' diet.

== See also ==
- List of birds of Niue
