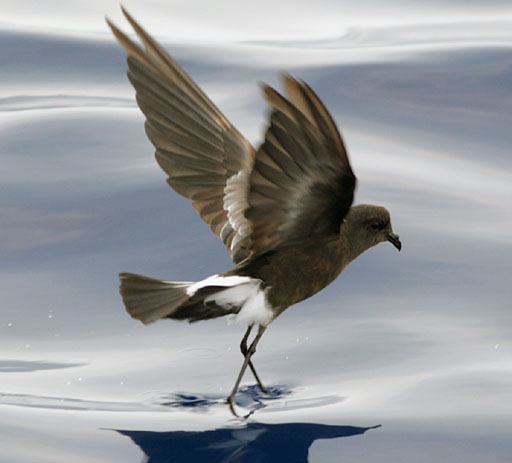
- Wilson's storm petrel (Oceanites oceanicus)

Scientific classification
- Kingdom: Animalia
- Phylum: Chordata
- Class: Aves
- Order: Procellariiformes
- Family: Oceanitidae; Forbes, 1881

Genera
- Oceanites; Garrodia; Pelagodroma; Fregetta; Nesofregetta

= Austral storm petrel =

Austral storm petrels

Family of birds

Austral storm petrels, or southern storm petrels, are seabirds in the family Oceanitidae, part of the order Procellariiformes. These smallest of seabirds feed on planktonic crustaceans and small fish picked from the surface, typically while hovering. Their flight is fluttering and sometimes bat-like. Historically, they were grouped together with the Hydrobatidae in an encompassing storm petrel group, though genetic testing found them to be distantly related, and so they were split.

Austral storm petrels have a cosmopolitan distribution, being found in all oceans, although only Wilson's storm petrel and white-faced storm petrel are found in the Northern Hemisphere. They are almost all strictly pelagic, coming to land only to breed. Little is known of the behaviour and distribution at sea for many species, where they can be hard to find and harder to identify. They are colonial nesters, displaying strong philopatry to their natal colonies and nesting sites. Most species nest in crevices or burrows, and all but one species attend their breeding colonies nocturnally. Pairs form long-term monogamous bonds and share incubation and chick-feeding duties. Like many species of seabirds, nesting is highly protracted with incubation taking up to 50 days and fledging another 70 days after that.

The family contains ten species assigned to five different genera. Several species are threatened by human activities. The New Zealand storm petrel was presumed extinct until rediscovered in 2003. The principal threats to storm petrels are introduced species, particularly mammals, in their breeding colonies; many storm petrels habitually nest on isolated mammal-free offshore islands and are unable to cope with predators such as rats and feral cats.

== Taxonomy ==
The family Oceanitidae was introduced in 1881 by the English zoologist William Alexander Forbes.

Two subfamilies of storm petrel were traditionally recognized. The Oceanitinae, or austral storm-petrels, were mostly found in southern waters (though Wilson's storm petrel regularly migrates into the Northern Hemisphere), with ten species placed in five genera. The Hydrobatinae, or northern storm petrels, were formerly placed in the two genera Hydrobates and Oceanodroma. These are largely restricted to the Northern Hemisphere, although a few visit or breed a short distance beyond the Equator. Cytochrome b DNA sequence analysis suggests that the family was paraphyletic and more accurately treated as distinct families. This study also found that the austral storm petrels are basal within the Procellariiformes: The first divergence was the subfamily Oceanitidae, with the Hydrobatidae splitting from the rest of the order at a later date. Few fossil species have been found, with the earliest being from the Upper Miocene.

== Morphology ==
Austral storm petrels are the smallest of all the seabirds, ranging in size from 15–26 cm (5.9–10.2 in) in length. They have short wings, square tails, elongated skulls, and long legs. The legs of all storm petrels are proportionally longer than those of other Procellariiformes, but they are very weak and unable to support the bird's weight for more than a few steps.

The plumage of the Oceanitidae is dark with white underparts (with the exception of Wilson's storm petrel) Onley and Scofield (2007) state that much published information is incorrect, and that photographs in the major seabird reference books and websites are frequently incorrectly ascribed as to species, being misidentified. They also consider that several national bird lists include species which have been incorrectly identified or have been accepted on inadequate evidence.

== Species ==
The family contains ten species:

Image	Common name	Scientific name	Distribution
	Wilson's storm petrel	Oceanites oceanicus	South Shetland Islands
	Elliot's storm petrel	Oceanites gracilis	Galápagos Islands, Peru, and Chile
	Pincoya storm petrel	Oceanites pincoyae	Chile
	Grey-backed storm petrel	Garrodia nereis	Antarctica, Argentina, Australia, Chile, Falkland Islands, French Southern Territories, New Zealand, Saint Helena, South Africa, and South Georgia and the South Sandwich Islands.
	White-faced storm petrel	Pelagodroma marina	Australia, New Zealand, Cape Verde Islands, Canary Islands, and Savage Islands.
	White-bellied storm petrel	Fregetta grallaria	Angola, Argentina, Australia, Brazil, Chile, Ecuador, French Polynesia, French Southern Territories, Maldives, Namibia, New Zealand, Perú, Saint Helena, and South Africa.
	Black-bellied storm petrel or Gould's storm petrel	Fregetta tropica	Antarctica, Argentina, Australia, Bouvet Island, Brazil, Chile, Falkland Islands, French Polynesia, French Southern Territories, Madagascar, Mozambique, New Zealand, Oman, Peru, Saint Helena, São Tomé and Príncipe, Solomon Islands, South Africa, South Georgia and the South Sandwich Islands, Uruguay, and Vanuatu.
	New Zealand storm petrel	Fregetta maoriana	Coromandel Peninsula of New Zealand's North Island,
	New Caledonian storm petrel	Fregetta lineata	New Caledonia and Australia
	Polynesian storm petrel (including white-throated storm petrel)	Nesofregetta fuliginosa	Chile, French Polynesia, Kiribati, New Caledonia, Vanuatu, possibly American Samoa

== Distribution ==
The austral storm petrels typically breed found in the Southern Hemisphere, in contrast to the northern storm-petrels from the Northern Hemisphere.

Several species of storm petrels undertake migrations after the breeding season. The most widely travelled migrant is Wilson's storm petrel, which after breeding in Antarctica and the subantarctic islands, regularly crosses the equator to the waters of the north Pacific and Atlantic Oceans. Some species, such as the grey-backed storm petrel, are thought to be essentially sedentary and do not undertake any migrations away from their breeding islands.

== Biology ==
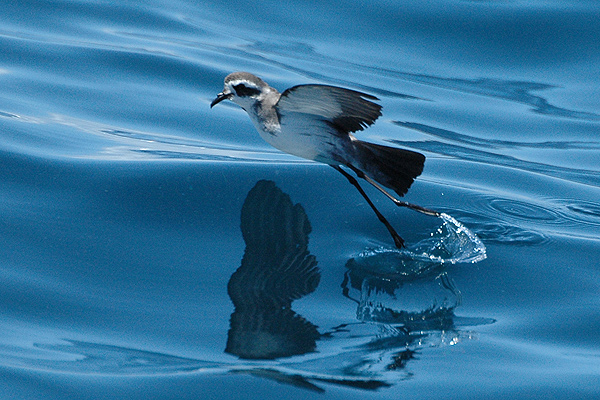
The white-faced storm petrel moves across the water's surface in a series of bounding leaps.

Storm petrels use a variety of techniques to aid in flight. Most species feed by surface pattering, holding and moving their feet on the water's surface while holding steady above the water. They remain stationary by hovering with rapid fluttering or using the wind to anchor themselves in place. This method of feeding flight is most commonly used by austral storm petrels. The white-faced storm petrel possesses a unique variation on pattering, holding its wings motionless and at an angle into the wind, it pushes itself off the water's surface in a succession of bounding jumps. Storm petrels also use dynamic soaring and slope soaring to travel over the ocean surface, although the first method is used less by this family compared to the northern storm petrels; slope soaring is more straightforward and favoured by the Oceanitidae: the storm petrel turns to the wind, gaining height, from where it can then glide back down to repeat the process.

=== Feeding ===
The diet of many storm petrels species is poorly known owing to difficulties in researching; overall the family is thought to concentrate on crustaceans. Small fish and molluscs are also taken by many species. Some species are known to be rather more specialised; the grey-backed storm petrel is known to concentrate on the larvae of goose barnacles.

Almost all species forage in the pelagic zone, except for Elliot's storm petrels, which are coastal feeders in the Galapagos Islands. Although storm petrels are capable of swimming well and often form "rafts" on the water's surface, they do not feed on the water. Instead, feeding usually takes place on the wing, with birds hovering above or "walking" on the surface (as discussed in the previous section) and snatching small morsels. Rarely, prey is obtained by making shallow dives under the surface.

Like many types of seabirds, storm petrels associate with other species of seabird and marine mammal species to help obtain food. They may benefit from the actions of diving predators, such as pinnipeds and penguins, which push prey up towards the surface while hunting, allowing the surface-feeding storm petrels to reach them.

=== Breeding ===
Storm petrels nest colonially, for the most part on islands, although a few species breed on larger landmasses, particularly Antarctica. Nesting sites are attended at night to avoid predators. Storm petrels display high levels of philopatry, returning to their natal colonies to breed. In one instance, a band-rumped storm petrel was caught as an adult 2 m (6 ft 7 in) from its natal burrow, where it was hatched.

Storm petrels nest either in burrows dug into soil or sand, or in small crevices in rocks and scree. Colonies can be extremely large and dense; 840,000 pairs of white-faced storm petrel nest on South East Island in the Chatham Islands in densities between 1.18 and 0.47 burrows per 1 m^{2} (11 sq ft). Competition for nesting sites is intense in colonies where storm petrels compete with other burrowing petrels, with shearwaters having been recorded to kill storm petrels to usurp their burrows.

Storm petrels are monogamous and form long-term pair bonds that last a number of years. As with the other Procellariiformes, a single relatively large egg is laid by a pair in a breeding season; if the egg fails, then usually no attempt is made to lay again (although a replacement may rarely be laid). Both sexes incubate in shifts of up to six days. The egg hatches after 40 or 50 days; the young is brooded continuously for another 7 days or so before being left alone in the nest during the day and fed by regurgitation at night. Meals fed to the chick weigh around 10–20% of the parent's body weight, and consist of both prey items and stomach oil. Stomach oil is energy-rich (its calorific value is around 9.6 kcal/g), created from partially digested prey in the proventriculus, a part of the foregut. By partly converting prey items into stomach oil, storm petrels can maximise the amount of energy chicks receive during feeding, an advantage for small seabird species that can only make a single visit to the chick during a 24-hour period (at night).

The time taken to hatch and raise the young is long for the bird's size, but is typical of seabirds, which in general are K-selected, living much longer, delaying breeding for longer, and investing more effort into fewer young. The average age at which chicks fledge depends on the species, taking between 50 and 70 days. The young leave their burrow at about 62 days. They are independent almost immediately and quickly disperse into the ocean. They return to their original colony after 2 or 3 years, but do not breed until at least 4 years old. Storm petrels have been recorded living as long as 30 years.

== Threats and conservation ==
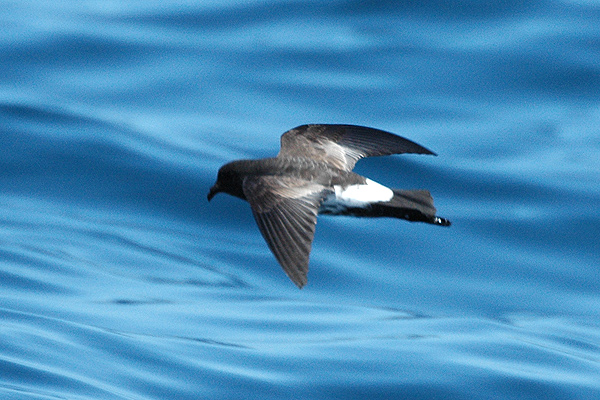
The New Zealand storm-petrel is critically endangered and was considered extinct

Several species of austral storm petrels are threatened by human activities. The New Zealand storm petrel is listed as critically endangered, and was also considered extinct for many years, but was sighted again in 2003, though the population is likely to be very small. Storm petrels face the same threats as other seabird species; in particular, they are threatened by introduced species.

Storm petrels in general are thought to be especially vulnerable to marine plastic pollution, as they predominantly feed on the surface where plastic flotsam may be very dense. The Southern Ocean is currently thought to be largely plastic pollution-free, though risks may increase if the Southern Ocean becomes more polluted.
