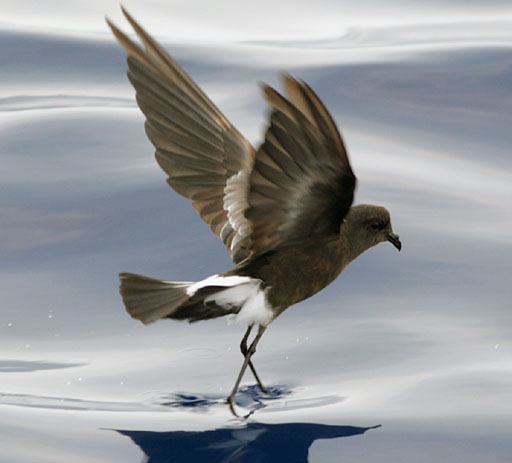
- Wilson's storm petrel 'walking' on the water off of Hatteras, North Carolina.

Scientific classification
- Domain: Eukaryota
- Kingdom: Animalia
- Phylum: Chordata
- Class: Aves
- Order: Procellariiformes
- Family: Oceanitidae
- Genus: Oceanites; Keyserling & Blasius, 1840

Type species
- Procellaria wilsonii Bonaparte = Procellaria oceanica Kuhl

Species
- O. oceanicus; O. gracilis; O. pincoyae; O. barrosi

= Oceanites =

Genus of birds

Oceanites is a genus of seabird in the austral storm petrel family. The genus name refers to the mythical Oceanids, the three thousand daughters of Tethys.

It contains the following species:

Genus Oceanites – Keyserling & Blasius, 1840 – four species
Common name	Scientific name and subspecies	Range	Size and ecology	IUCN status and estimated population
Wilson's storm petrel	Oceanites oceanicus (Kuhl, 1820)	South Shetland Islands	Size: Habitat: Diet:	LC
Elliot's storm petrel	Oceanites gracilis (Elliot, 1859)	Galápagos Islands, Peru and Chile	Size: Habitat: Diet:	LC
Pincoya storm petrel	Oceanites pincoyae (Harrison et al., 2013)	Chiloé Island (Reloncavi Sound and the Chacao Channel), Chile	Size: Habitat: Diet:	LC
Andean storm petrel	Oceanites barrosi (Heraldo V. Norambuena, Rodrigo Barros, Álvaro Jaramillo, Fernando Medrano, Chris Gaskin, Tania King, Karen Baird, Cristián E. Hernádez., 2024)	Chile	Size: Habitat: Diet:	LC
