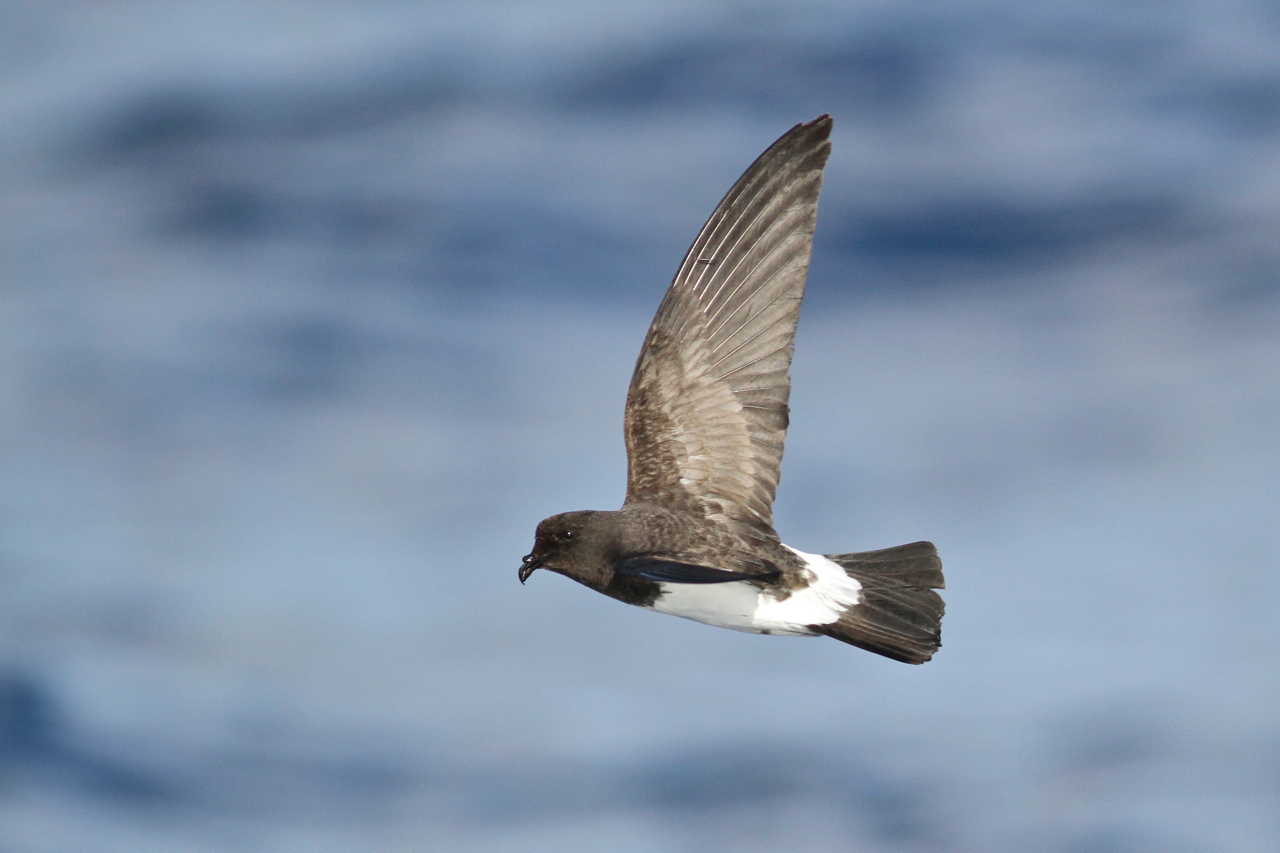
- White-bellied storm petrel near Lord Howe Island

Conservation status
- Least Concern (IUCN 3.1)

Scientific classification
- Kingdom: Animalia
- Phylum: Chordata
- Class: Aves
- Order: Procellariiformes
- Family: Oceanitidae
- Genus: Fregetta
- Species: F. grallaria

Binomial name
- Fregetta grallaria (Vieillot, 1818)
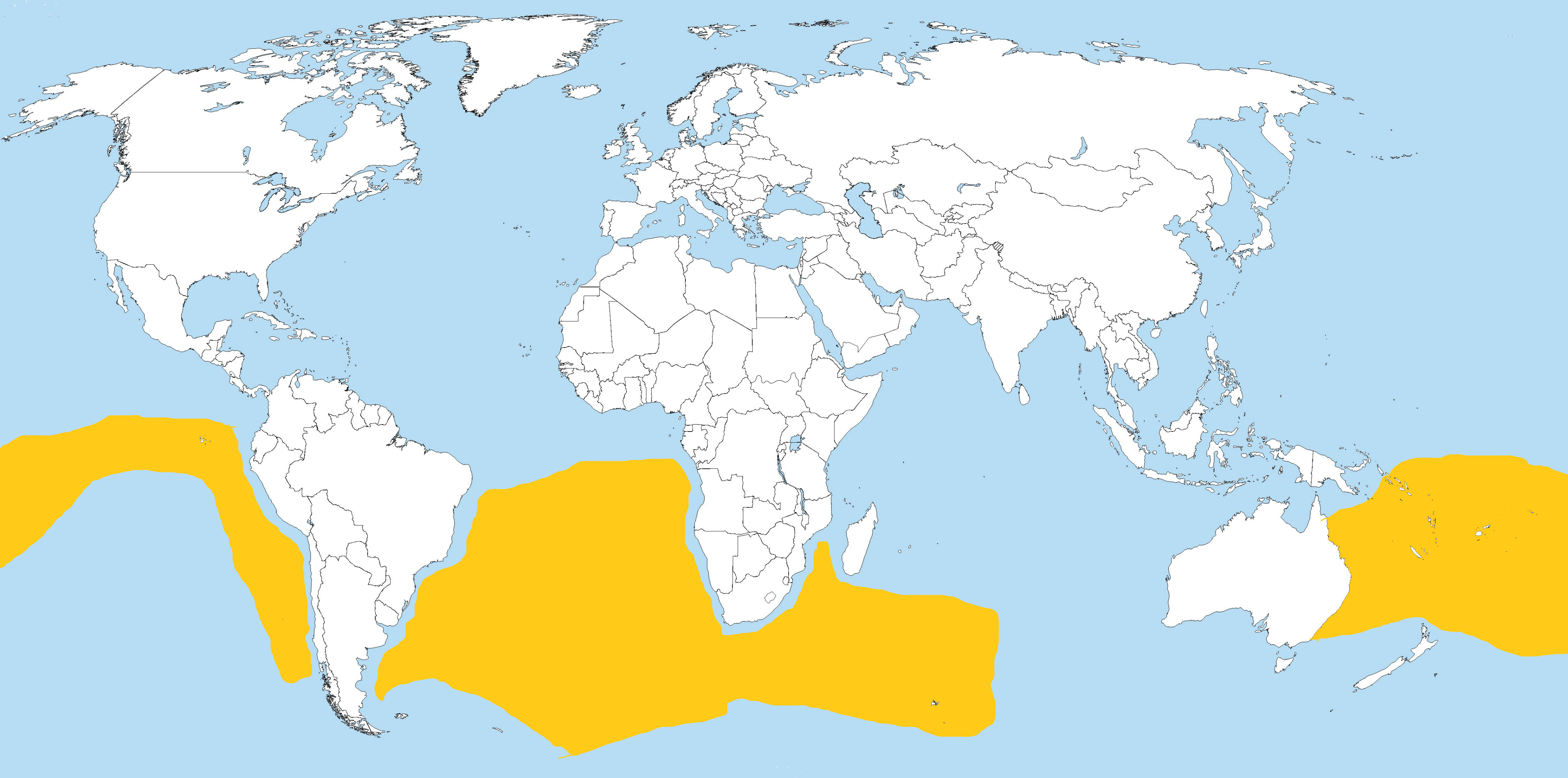

= White-bellied storm petrel =

Species of bird

The white-bellied storm petrel (Fregetta grallaria) is a species of seabird in the family Oceanitidae. It is found in Angola, Argentina, Australia, Brazil, Chile, Ecuador, French Polynesia, French Southern Territories, Maldives, Namibia, New Zealand, Perú, Saint Helena, and South Africa. Its natural habitat is open seas.

== Taxonomy ==
The white-bellied storm petrel was formally described in 1818 by the French ornithologist Louis Pierre Vieillot. He used the French name "Le pétrel échasse" and coined the binomial name Procellaria grallaria. The white-bellied storm petrel is now placed in the genus Fregetta that was introduced in 1855 by the French naturalist Charles Lucien Bonaparte. The specific epithet grallaria is from Modern Latin grallarius meaning "stilt-walker".

Four subspecies are recognised:

- F. g. grallaria (Vieillot, 1818) – tropical western Pacific Ocean, breeding on Lord Howe Island and the Kermadec Islands
- F. g. leucogaster (Gould, 1844) – south Atlantic and south Indian Oceans, breeding on Tristan da Cunha, Gough Island, Île Saint-Paul and Amsterdam Island
- F. g. segethi (Philippi & Landbeck, 1860) – southeast Pacific Ocean, breeding on the Juan Fernández Islands and the Desventuradas Islands
- F. g. titan Murphy, 1928 – south Pacific Ocean, breeding on Easter Island

The white-bellied storm petrel of the southern hemisphere is a poorly understood pelagic species showing morphological differences and varied colour phases; it is easily confused with similar species of black and white storm petrels.

Subclassification of the genus Fregetta has been described as "tentative" awaiting the clarification of further study, in particular genetic studies. The large degree of speciation observed amongst storm petrels may relate to remote island-nesting patterns associated with specific water types.

== Description ==
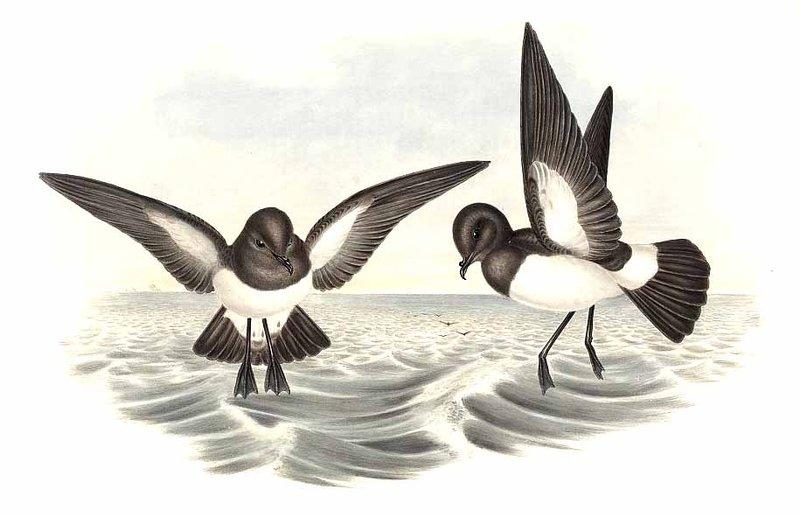
Fregetta grallaria by John Gould

The species is characterised on colour patterns, the condition of the nasal tubes, tail shape, structure of claws, and proportions of the leg bones. Fregetta spp. have their plumage black above, white below, and white upper tail coverts, nasal tube free at end and upturned, half culmen in length; tarsus booted in front, webs black, basal joint middle toe flattened, and claws blunt and flattened.

The white-bellied storm petrel is a small bird, around 18 to 20 centimetres (7.1–7.9 in) in length with a wing span of 46–48 cm (18.1–18.9 in), tubenose, with a fine black bill, square tail, and polymorphic patterns of black, grey, and white plumage. As the name suggests, the upper parts are dark and the underparts are light coloured with many variations in plumage observed including a largely dark variant. Its legs are long (grallae being Latin for "stilts") and a distinguishing characteristic is that the toes do not usually project beyond the tail. Plumage variation between sexes and between adults and juveniles has not been observed.

It is thought to be customarily silent at sea and vocal when on the nest on land. The voice has been described as "soft high-pitched twittering calls, such as pee-pee-pee-pee repeated up to 20 times."

== Distribution and habitat ==
The white-bellied storm petrel has a widespread range throughout the oceans of the Southern Hemisphere including the Pacific, Atlantic, and Indian Oceans, although little detail is known of its pelagic distribution.

Sources describe the white-bellied storm petrel as both nonmigratory and fully migrant reflecting perhaps how little is known or understood of this elusive sea bird. It is thought to migrate some distance north, but its movements at sea are not known. Maximum dispersal has been estimated at several thousand km.

== Behaviour ==
The white-bellied storm petrel is highly pelagic, rare and not commonly observed. As a result, there is limited knowledge of its behaviour and ecology. Visits to land are uncommon and occur near breeding colonies. It is nocturnal when ashore.

Flight tends to be low gliding with pattering and dipping to feed, stepping off the water's surface with their legs, an asymmetrical gait having been observed. It has been known to feed with other seabirds and to follow ships.

=== Breeding ===
Breeding colonies have been identified in the Lord Howe Island group (Roach Island, Ball's Pyramid, Muttonbird Island and possibly Blackburn Island), although they are extinct on the main island of Lord Howe itself (Australia'); on Macauley and Curtis Islands in the Kermadec Islands (New Zealand'); the Austral Islands (French Polynesia) and Juan Fernández and Desventuradas Islands ('Chile) in the Pacific Ocean; Tristan da Cunha and Gough Island (St Helena to UK') in the Atlantic Ocean; and Île Saint-Paul (French Southern Territories) in the Indian Ocean.

Breeding sites occur on offshore islands and rocky outcrops in dispersed colonies with grass-lined nests built in crevices and burrows. Breeding occurs in late summer and early autumn, with egg laying between January and March, and fledgling chicks seen from mid-April to May. The average clutch is a single white egg with light red, brown, or pink specks. Young are fed by both parents, which spend the day at sea and return to the nest at night.

Little is known of the life and times of the white-bellied storm petrel, but extrapolations from cogeners postulate a generation time of 15.2 years (assuming "an average age at first breeding of 4.7 years, an annual survival of adults of 87.8% and a maximum longevity of 30.4 years ").

=== Food and feeding ===
Small crustaceans, small squid and sea skaters have been identified as dietary components. Feeding occurs by skimming across the water and dipping to catch their submarine mark near the surface. Young are fed by both parents with crustaceans and squid.

== Population ==
The quality of data on which population estimates are based is recognised to be poor and unreliable. In 2004 Brookes estimated the global population of Fregetta grallaria to be some 300,000, a population thought to be likely in decline as a result of predatory invasive species.

The global population of Fregetta grallari grallaria is estimated at 2,500 pairs. An estimated 1,000 breeding pairs of Fregetta grallari grallaria (Tasman Sea) nest in the Lord Howe Island group but are now extinct on the main island. Tasman Sea which may be a subspecies, F. g. grallaria. Populations of Fregetta grallaria grallaria and Fregetta grallaria titan in the eastern Pacific have been described as "meagre". The white-bellied storm petrel is considered to be rare in New Zealand with an estimated 700 nesters.

== Conservation status ==
Significant deficiencies in the data sources that inform these decisions are well-recognised. The IUCN Red List evaluates Fregetta grallaria as being of least concern based on range size, population trend, and population size criteria.

In New Zealand, its conservation status is nationally endangered (2013).

In Australia, the commonwealth status listing of F. grallaria is vulnerable. Nationally in Australia, the Environmental Protection and Biodiversity Conservation Act statutory listing status is vulnerable and requires a recovery plan (2009). Its nonstatutory listing under the NGO Action Plan for Australian Birds 2010 is vulnerable. In New South Wales, Australia, at the state level, F. grallaria is listed as vulnerable under the Threatened Species Conservation Act 1995.

F. g. gallaria (Tasman Sea) is "considered to be vulnerable at the global level". The Australian breeding population is listed as vulnerable ("small populations at five locations with plausible future threat") and the population visiting Australian territory as near threatened ("seven locations with plausible future threat") under the Action Plan for Australian Birds 2010. All existing breeding populations are now important to long-term survival.

The natural history of the seabird (longevity, delayed fertility and small clutch size) renders them susceptible to changes in their environment. The status of the world's seabirds is considered to be both more threatened and to be deteriorating faster than comparable groups. Identified threats include commercial fishing, marine pollution, predation by alien invasive species, habitat loss, and direct disturbance and exploitation by humans.

Heavy metals including mercury and cadmium have been identified at toxic levels in the seabirds of Gough Island, a breeding site for F. grallaria. Ingested plastics are a recognised hazard and may be more prone to accumulate in Procellariiformes for anatomical reasons (constricted entry to the gizzard limits regurgitation). Ship and other artificial lights confuse seabirds and Fregetta grallaria are at risk when returning to breeding grounds at night.

In Australia, the primary sources of threat to F. grallaria are habitat loss and invasive species, the latter introduced by fishing and shipping vessels and land-based activity, in particular the domestic cat and the black rat. The impact of invasive species is considered a 'concern' for breeding and a 'potential concern' for foraging by the commonwealth and include reduced reproductive success, direct mortality, and ecosystem degradation. The extinction of F. grallaria on Lord Howe island is attributed to the introduction of the black rat in 1918.

Identified sources of 'potential concern' include climate change, shipping vessels, fishing vessels, land-based activities, tourism, recreational and charter fishing, and research activities. These effects are mediated through changes in sea temperature, oceanography, ocean acidification, chemical pollution and contamination, marine debris, light pollution, oil pollution, and human presence and activities.

== Climate change ==
The productivity of the sea surface is predicted to change due to changes in sea temperature as a result of ongoing global climate change, and seabirds are particularly vulnerable to such change. Sea temperatures have warmed by 0.7 °C (1.3 °F) between 1910-1929 and 1989–2008, and current projections estimate ocean temperatures will be 1 °C (1.8 °F) warmer by 2030.

F. g. grallaria is listed amongst the birds most sensitive to climate change effects, especially when breeding. Increased vulnerability is due to the population being small and localised, slow breeding, and specialised feeding patterns. The anticipated southerly shift in food distribution is expected to detrimentally affect reproductive outcomes. Local extinction is a real prospect.

== Priorities ==
Derived from a global assessment of seabirds (2012), the following priority actions have been recommended:

- formal and effective site protection, especially for Important Bird Area (IBA) breeding sites and for marine IBA feeding and aggregation sites, as part of national, regional and global networks of Marine Protected Areas;
- removal of invasive, especially predatory, alien species (a list of priority sites is provided), as part of habitat and species recovery initiatives; and
- reduction of bycatch to negligible levels, as part of comprehensive implementation of ecosystem approaches to fisheries.
