= Domesticated quail =

Domesticated birds of several species

A domesticated quail is a domestic form of the quail, a collective name which refers to a group of several small species of fowl. Thousands of years of breeding and domestication have guided the bird's evolution. Humans domesticated quails for meat and egg production; additionally, quails can be kept as pets. Domesticated quails are commonly kept in long wire cages and are fed game bird feed. The most common domesticated type is the Coturnix quail (also known as the Japanese quail). Quails live on the ground, and rarely fly unless forced to do so.

== Breeds ==
Twenty types of wild quail exist along with 70 domestic breeds/strains, including laboratory and commercial lines. Due to their large size, Coturnix quails are kept for meat and egg consumption. This breed contains more meat and produces more eggs than the others. Button quails (also known as King Quail, Chinese-Painted Quail and Blue-Breasted quail) are rarely kept for food production because they are smaller and produce fewer eggs. They are kept in large aviaries to clean the leftover seeds that fall to the floor. California, Gambel's, Bobwhite, Scaled quails, etc. are less common and are rarely kept as pets.

=== Quail breeds ===
- Coturnix or Japanese quail
- Button, King, Chinese-Painted or Blue-Breasted quail
- (Northern) Bobwhite quail
- Gambel's quail
- Mearn's quail
- Mountain quail
- Scaled quail
- California (Valley) quail
- Manipur Bush quail
- Jungle Bush quail

Both Button and Coturnix quail have different feather coloring due to years of breeding. The common and wild Coturnix quail color is the Pharaoh breed, which is a brown feather color. The Button quail has a red belly, blue body, black and white head, and a brown back all in one (only present in males; females are a brown color all over). The Manipur Bush quail can be found mainly along the river Brahmaputra, in Assam, Manipur, Meghalaya, Nagaland and West Bengal in India.

=== Coturnix (Japanese) quail feather coloring ===
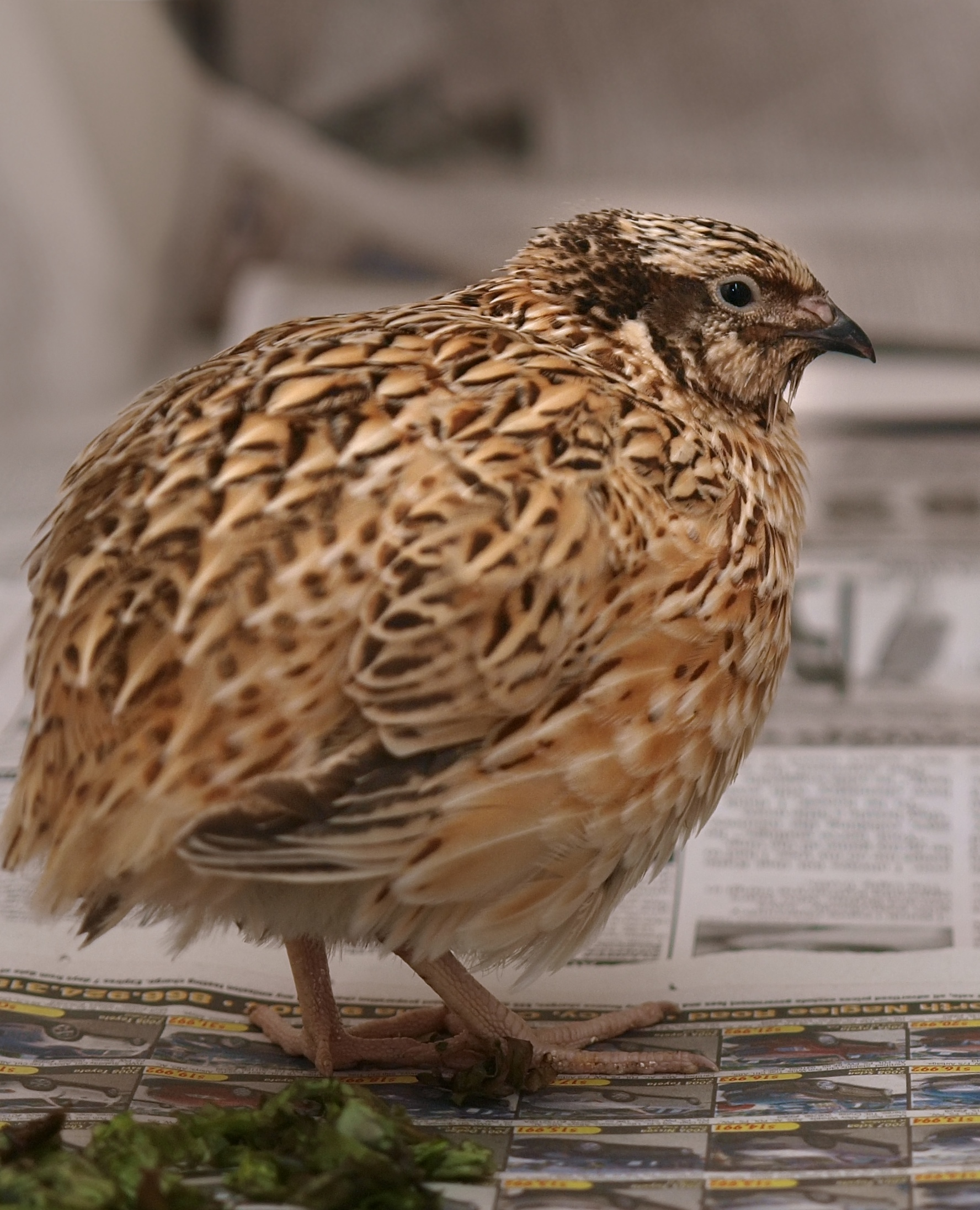
- Japanese quail (Coturnix japonica)
  Pharaoh - Rusty brown presented underbelly and an original brown color on the head and upper body.
- English White - White all over in both males and females.
- Manchurian Golden - Light rusty all over with a pattern. Males have a darker rusty color presented on the head while females are lighter in color.
- Italian - Beige with striated marking. Males are presented with brown faces.
- Tibetan (Dark British Range) - Dark chocolate all over with a spot of white under the beaks.
- Rosetta (British Range) - Red-brown chocolate all over.
- Silver - Light grey all over.
- Tuxedo - White and brown mix.
- Cinnamon (Red Range) - Light brown all over.
- Scarlet (Red Golden) - Red-brown all over.
- Roux - Lighter than the Pharaoh (wild) version.
- Golden Tuxedo - White feathers all over with blonde feathers presented.

Other colors seen may be mutations.

=== Button quail feather coloring ===
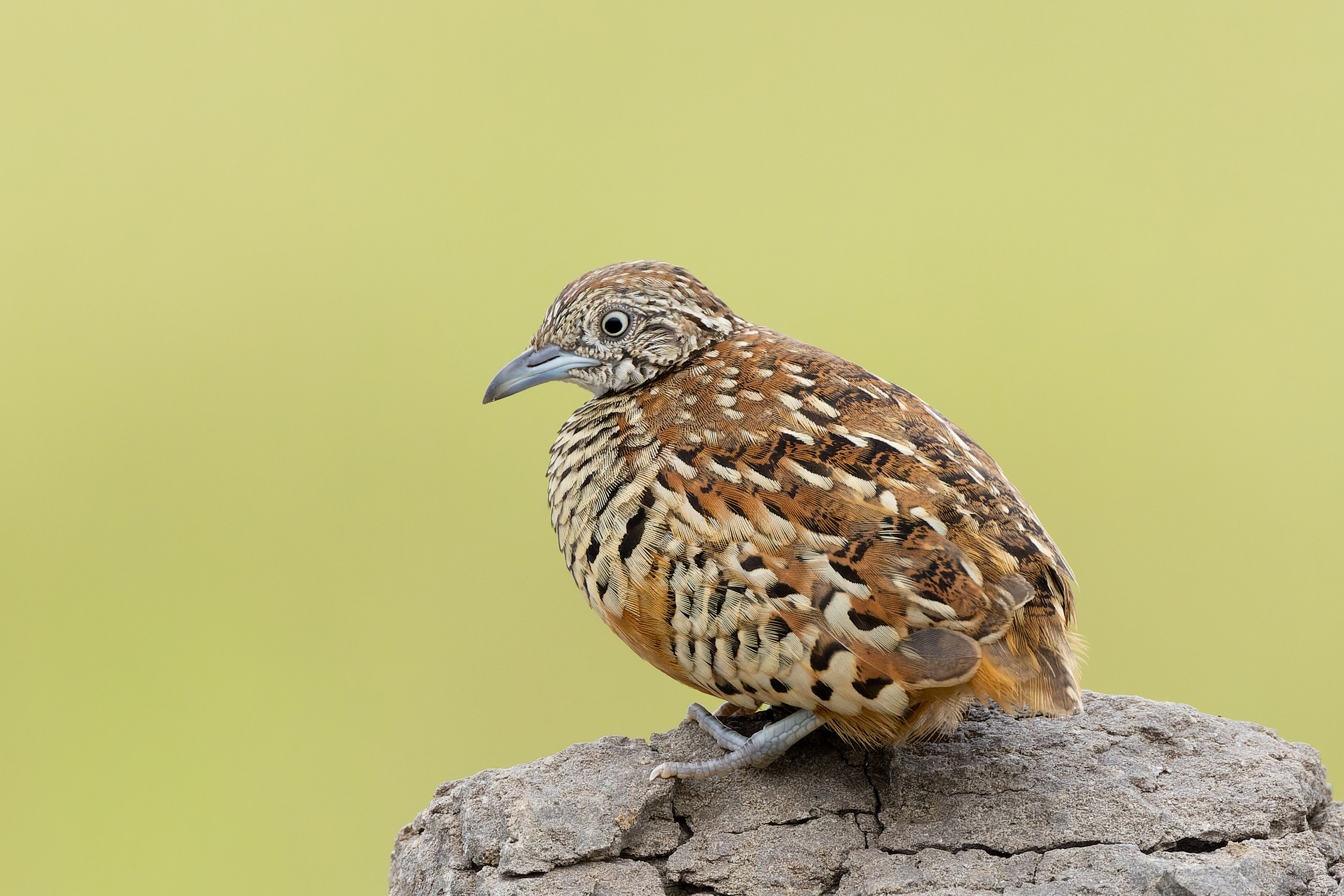
- Barred buttonquail (Turnix suscitator)
  Wild (Common) Feather Color - Red breast, blue body, black and white face, and a brown back. Females are brown all over.
- Silver - Another common feather coloring. Both females and males are a light grey. Males are presented with a black and white face.
- White - Plain white all over in both males and females.
- Red Breasted - Large red underbelly. Much alike the wild feather coloring.
- Blue Faced - Blue underbelly and dark brown back in males and a dark brown all over in females.
- Cinnamon - Light brown.
- Golden Pearl - Females are a lighter brown.
- Tuxedo Pied - A white and brown color mix.

Other colors seen may be mutations.
