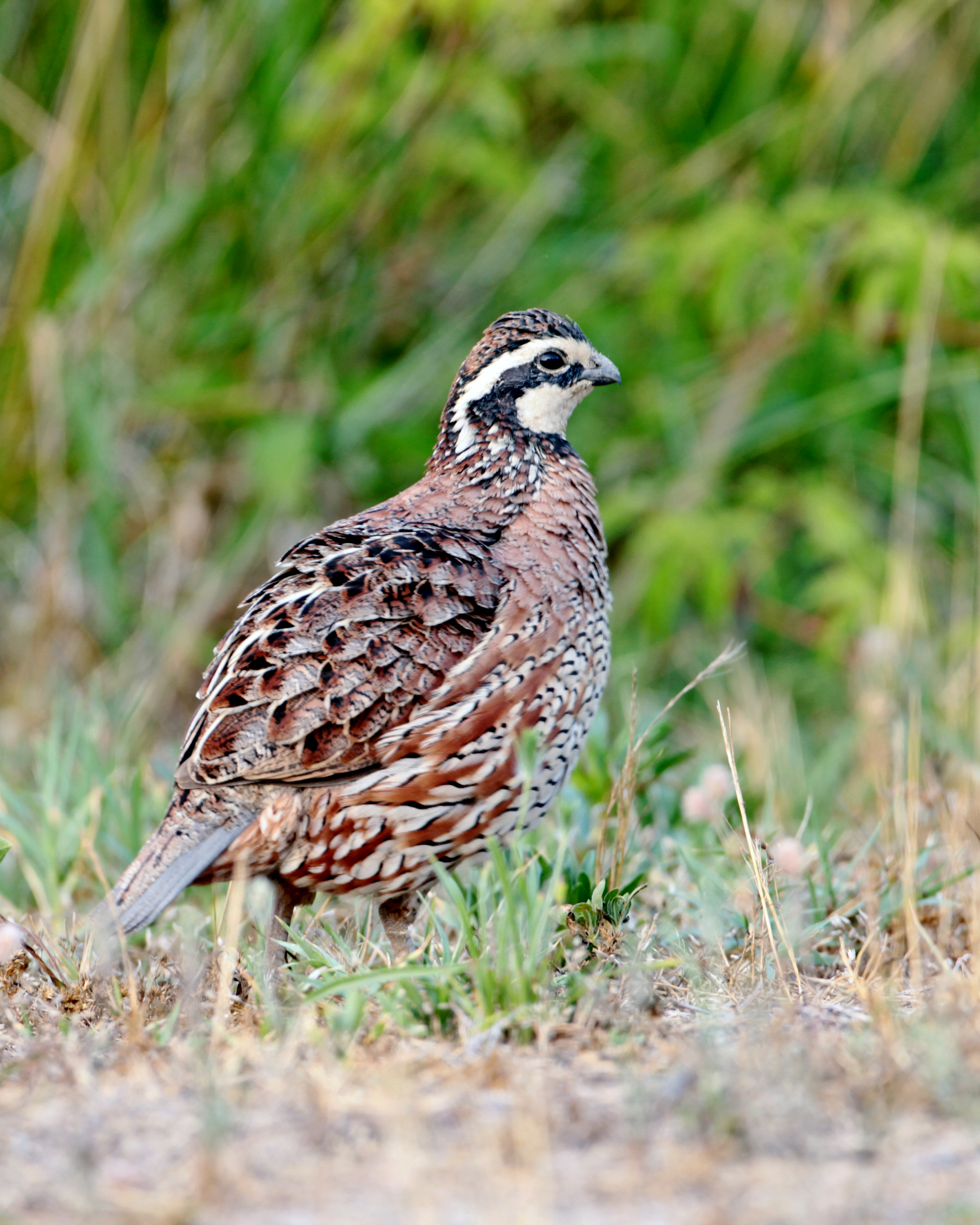
- Adult male C. v. virginianus, Chincoteague NWR, Virginia
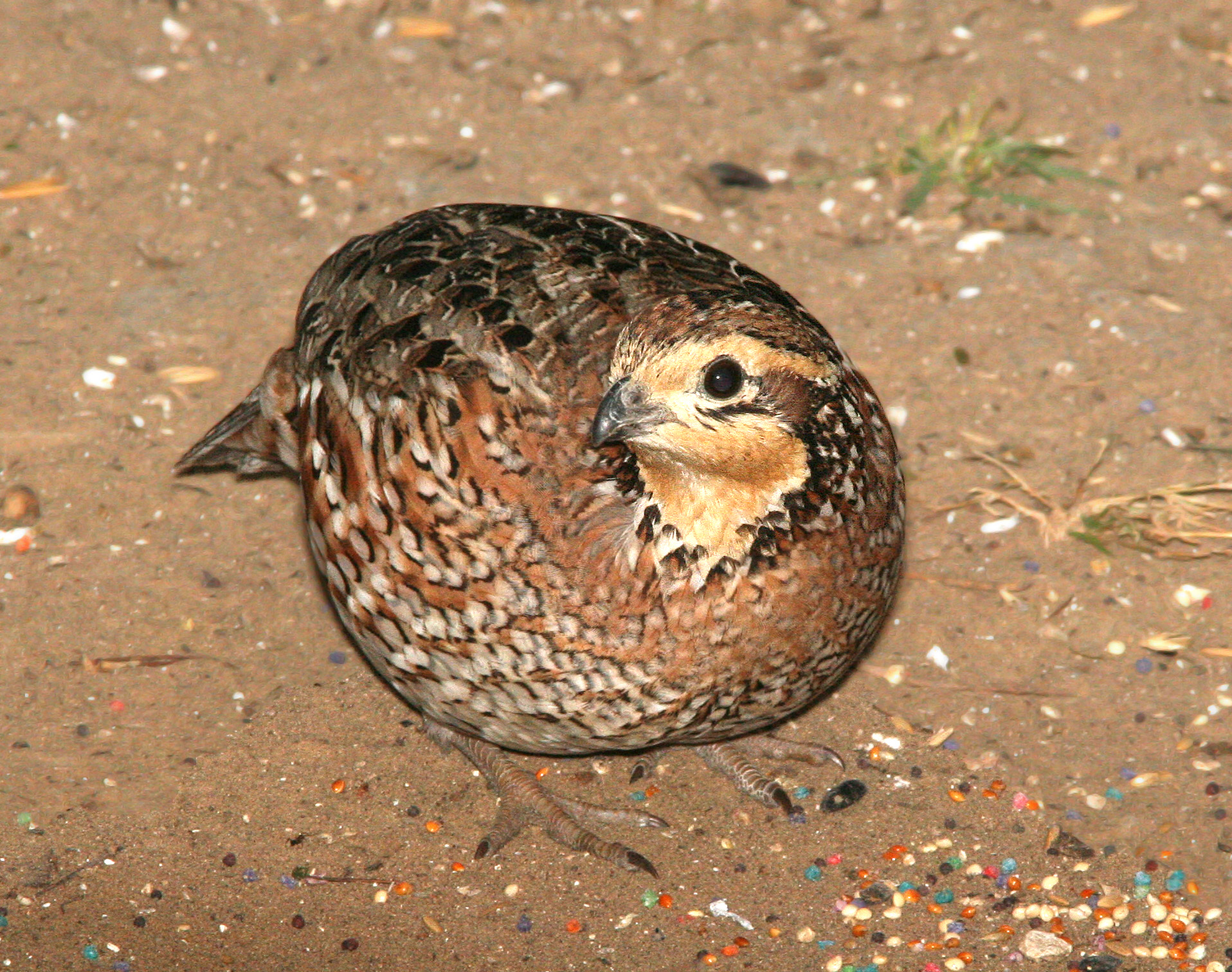
- Adult female C. v. texanus, Falcon State Park, Texas

Conservation status
- Near Threatened (IUCN 3.1)

- Apparently Secure (NatureServe)

Scientific classification
- Kingdom: Animalia
- Phylum: Chordata
- Class: Aves
- Order: Galliformes
- Family: Odontophoridae
- Genus: Colinus
- Species: C. virginianus

Binomial name
- Colinus virginianus (Linnaeus, 1758)
- Range

Synonyms
- Tetrao virginianus Linnaeus, 1758; Ortyx virginiana Jardine, 1834

= Northern bobwhite =

Northern bobwhite Temporal range: Pleistocene–present

Species of bird

The northern bobwhite (Colinus virginianus), also known as the Virginia quail or (in its home range) bobwhite quail, is a ground-dwelling bird native to Canada, the United States, Mexico, and Cuba, with introduced populations elsewhere in the Caribbean, Europe, and Asia. It is a member of the group of species known as New World quail (Odontophoridae). They were initially placed with the Old World quail in the pheasant family (Phasianidae), but are not particularly closely related. The name "bobwhite" is an onomatopoeic derivation from its characteristic whistling call. Despite its secretive nature, the northern bobwhite is one of the most familiar quails in eastern North America, because it is frequently the only quail in its range. Habitat degradation has contributed to the northern bobwhite population in eastern North America declining by roughly 85% from 1966 to 2014. This population decline is apparently range-wide and continuing.

There are 20 subspecies of northern bobwhite, many of which are hunted extensively as game birds. One subspecies, the masked bobwhite (Colinus virginianus ridgwayi), is listed as critically endangered with wild populations located in the northern Mexican state of Sonora and a reintroduced population in Buenos Aires National Wildlife Refuge in southern Arizona.

== Taxonomy ==
The northern bobwhite was formally described in 1758 by the Swedish naturalist Carl Linnaeus in the tenth edition of his Systema Naturae under the binomial name Tetrao virginianus. Linnaeus specified the type location as "America" but this has been restricted to the state of Virginia. Linnaeus based his account on the "American partridge" that had been described and illustrated by the English naturalist Mark Catesby in his book The Natural History of Carolina, Florida and the Bahama Islands. The northern bobwhite is now one of four species placed in the genus Colinus that was introduced in 1820 by the German naturalist Georg August Goldfuss.

=== Subspecies ===
Plate 76 of Birds of America by John James Audubon depicting Virginian Partridge.

There are 20 recognized subspecies in four groups. One subspecies, the Key West bobwhite (C. v. insulanus), is extinct. The subspecies are listed in taxonomic order:

- Eastern group
  - C. v. virginianus (Linnaeus, 1758) - Virginia bobwhite - eastern North America from Ontario south to northern Florida (includes former subspecies marilandicus and mexicanus)
  - C. v. floridanus (Coues, 1872) – Florida bobwhite – peninsular Florida
  - †C. v. insulanus (Howe, 1904) – Key West bobwhite – the Florida Keys (extinct)
  - C. v. cubanensis (GR Gray, 1846) – Cuban bobwhite – Cuba and Isla de la Juventud; introduced to Hispaniola, Puerto Rico, the Bahamas, and the Turks and Caicos islands
  - C. v. taylori (Lincoln, 1915) – plains bobwhite – South Dakota to northern Texas, western Missouri and northwestern Arkansas
  - C. v. texanus (Lawrence, 1853) – Texas bobwhite – southwestern Texas to northern Mexico
  - C. v. aridus (Lawrence, 1853) – Jaumave bobwhite – west-central Tamaulipas to southeastern San Luis Potosí
  - C. v. maculatus (Nelson, 1899) – spot-bellied bobwhite – central Tamaulipas to northern Veracruz and southeastern San Luis Potosí
- Grayson's group
  - C. v. graysoni (Lawrence, 1867) – Grayson's bobwhite – west-central Mexico
  - C. v. nigripectus (Nelson, 1897) – Puebla bobwhite – eastern Mexico
- Black-breasted group
  - C. v. pectoralis (Gould, 1843) – black-breasted bobwhite – eastern slopes and mountains of central Veracruz
  - C. v. godmani (Nelson, 1897) – Godman's bobwhite – eastern slopes and mountains of central Veracruz
  - C. v. minor (Nelson, 1901) – least bobwhite – northeastern Chiapas and Tabasco
  - C. v. thayeri (Bangs and Peters, 1928) – Thayer's bobwhite – northeastern Oaxaca
- Masked group
  - C. v. ridgwayi (Brewster, 1885) – masked bobwhite – north-central Sonora; reintroduced to Arizona
  - C. v. atriceps (Ogilvie-Grant, 1893) – black-headed bobwhite – interior of western Oaxaca
  - C. v. harrisoni (Orr and Webster, 1968) – Harrison's bobwhite – southwestern Oaxaca
  - C. v. coyoleos (Müller, PLS, 1776) – Coyoleos bobwhite – Pacific Coast of Oaxaca and Chiapas
  - C. v. salvini (Nelson, 1897) – Salvin's bobwhite – coastal and southern Chiapas
  - C. v. insignis (Nelson, 1897) – Guatemalan bobwhite – Guatemala (Rio Chiapas Valley) and southeastern Chiapas (includes former subspecies nelsoni)

The Cuban subspecies of hybrid origin between southeast Mexican birds introduced early by either the Spanish or possibly in the pre-Hispanic era by the Taíno people at some point between the 12th and 16th centuries, and later introductions in the 18th-20th centuries from the southeastern United States.

The holotype specimen of Ortyx pectoralis is held in the collections of the National Museums Liverpool at the World Museum, with accession number D3713. The specimen died in the aviary at Knowsley Hall, Lancashire and came to the Liverpool national collection via the 13th Earl of Derby's collection, which was bequeathed to the people of Liverpool in 1851.

== Description ==
The northern bobwhite is a moderately-sized quail, and is the only small galliform native to eastern North America. The bobwhite can range from 24 to 28 cm (9.4 to 11.0 in) in length with a 33 to 38 cm (13 to 15 in) wingspan. As indicated by body mass, weights increase in birds found further north, as corresponds to Bergmann's rule. In Mexico, northern bobwhites weigh from 129 to 159 g (4.6 to 5.6 oz) whereas in the north they average 170 to 173 g (6.0 to 6.1 oz) and large males can attain as much as 255 g (9.0 oz). Among standard measurements, the wing chord is 9.7 to 11.7 cm (3.8 to 4.6 in), the tail is 5 to 6.8 cm (2.0 to 2.7 in) the culmen is 1.3 to 1.6 cm (0.51 to 0.63 in) and the tarsus is 2.7 to 3.3 cm (1.1 to 1.3 in). It has the typical chunky, rounded shape of a quail. The bill is short, curved and brown-black in color. This species is sexually dimorphic. Males have a white throat and brow stripe bordered by black. The overall rufous plumage has gray mottling on the wings, white scalloped stripes on the flanks, and black scallops on the whitish underparts. The tail is gray.

The clear whistle "bob-WHITE" or "bob-bob-WHITE" call is very recognizable. The syllables are slow and widely spaced, rising in pitch a full octave from beginning to end. Other calls include lisps, peeps, and more rapidly whistled warning calls.

== Distribution and habitat ==
The northern bobwhite can be found year-round in agricultural fields, grassland, open woodland areas, roadsides and wood edges. Its range covers the southeastern quadrant of the United States from the Great Lakes and southern Minnesota east to New York State and southern Massachusetts, and extending west to southern Nebraska, Kansas, Oklahoma, Colorado front-range foothills to 7,000 feet, and all but westernmost Texas.

It is absent from the southern tip of Florida (where the extinct Key West bobwhite subspecies once lived) and the highest elevations of the Appalachian Mountains, but occurs in eastern Mexico and in Cuba, and has been introduced to Hispaniola (both the Dominican Republic and Haiti), the Bahamas, the Turks and Caicos Islands, the U.S. Virgin Islands (formerly), Puerto Rico, France, China, Portugal, and Italy. Isolated populations also have been introduced in the US states of Oregon and Washington. The northern bobwhite has also been introduced to New Zealand.

There is no self-sustaining population in Pennsylvania, where the bird is considered regionally extinct; it is also considered extirpated in the states of New Hampshire and Connecticut. Its distribution in New York has been limited to Suffolk and Nassau Counties on Long Island, as well as potential population pockets in Upstate New York. The bird is considered declining or extirpated throughout much of the Northeastern United States. Similarly, the bird is almost extirpated from Ontario (and Canada as a whole), with the only self-sustaining population confirmed to exist recorded on Walpole Island.

== Behavior and ecology ==
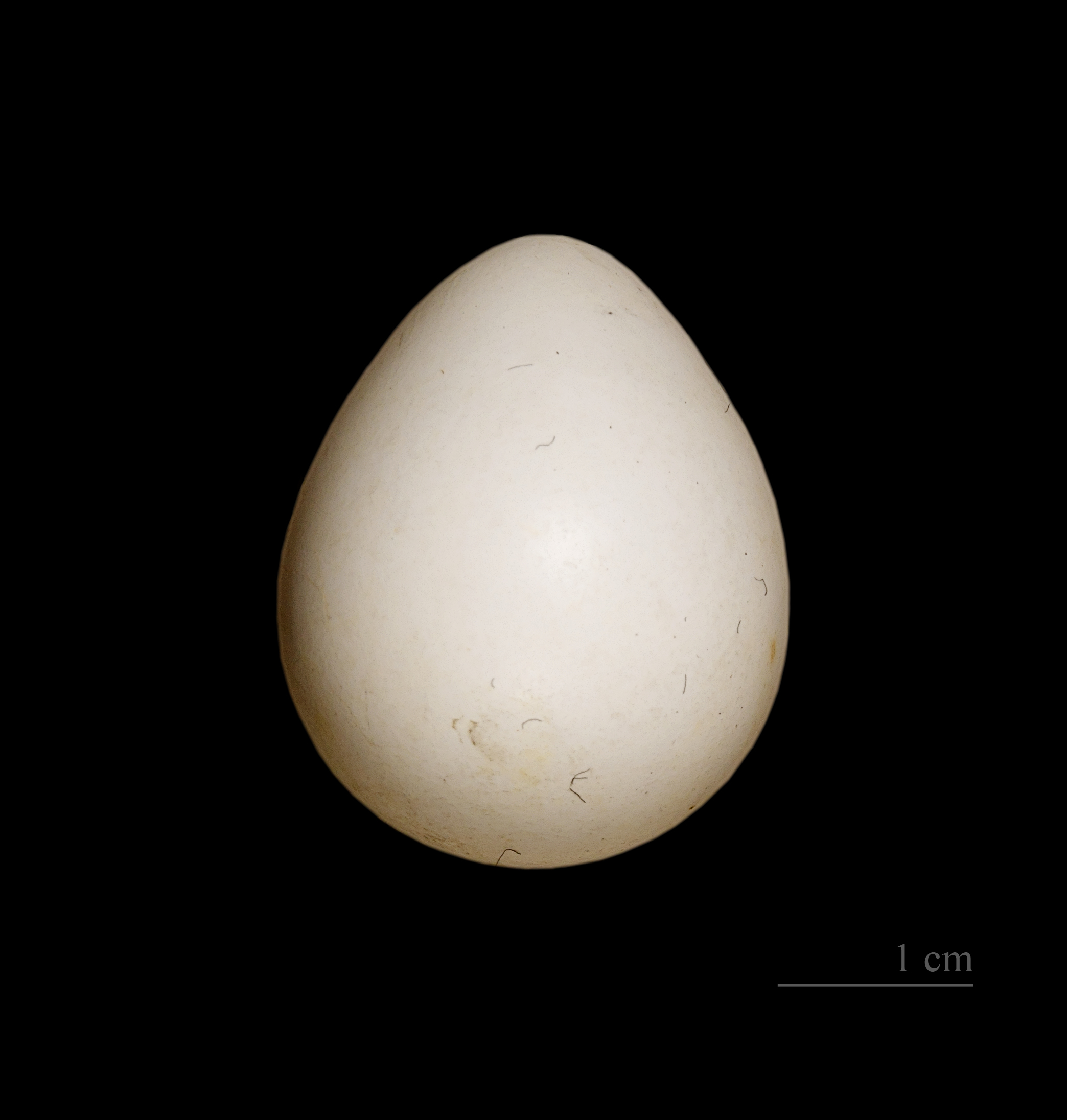
Egg

Like most game birds, the northern bobwhite is shy and elusive. When threatened, it will crouch and freeze, relying on camouflage to stay undetected, but will flush into low flight if closely disturbed. It is generally solitary or paired early in the year, but family groups are common in the late summer and winter roosts may have two dozen or more birds in a single covey.

=== Breeding ===
The species was once considered monogamous, but with the advent of radio telemetry, the sexual behavior of bobwhites has better been described as ambisexual polygamy. The eggs measure 3 cm (1.2 in) in length and 2.5 cm (0.98 in) in width. Either parent may incubate a clutch for 23 days, and the precocial young leave the nest shortly after hatching. The main source of nest failure is predation, with nest success averaging 28% across their range. However, the nest success of stable populations is typically much higher than this average, and the aforementioned estimate includes values for declining populations.

Brooding behavior varies in that amalgamation (kidnapping, adopting, creching, gang brooding) may occur. An incubating parent may alternatively stay with its young. A hen may re-nest up to four times until she has a successful nest. However, it is extremely rare for bobwhites to hatch more than two successful nests within one nesting season.

=== Food and feeding ===
The northern bobwhite's diet consists of plant material and small invertebrates, such as snails, ticks, grasshoppers, beetles, spiders, crickets, and leafhoppers. Plant sources include seeds, wild berries, partridge peas, and cultivated grains. It forages on the ground in open areas with some spots of taller vegetation.

Optimal nutrient requirements for bobwhite vary depending on the age of bird and the time of the year. For example, the optimal protein requirement for egg laying hens (23% protein) is much higher than for males (16%).

== Status ==
The northern bobwhite is rated as a Near-threatened species by the International Union for Conservation of Nature. The northern bobwhite is threatened across its range due to habitat loss and habitat degradation. Changing land use patterns and changing fire regimes have caused once prime habitat to become unfavorable for the bobwhite.

=== Masked bobwhite ===
The masked bobwhite subspecies, C. v. ridgwayi, is listed as endangered in the U.S. The birds were twice declared extirpated in Arizona in the past century. It was originally endemic to southern Arizona in the U.S., and northern Sonora in Mexico. It is considered a Critically Imperiled Subspecies by NatureServe.

The masked bobwhite was in decline since its discovery in 1884. By 1900, the subspecies was already extinct in the U.S. Populations remained in Mexico, but their study was curtailed by political events in Mexico, including the Mexican Revolution and the last of the Yaqui Wars. A population of the masked bobwhite was finally discovered and studied in Mexico, in 1931 and 1932.

A native population historically existed in Sonora, but by 2017, its population appeared to be declining, or possibly extinct. A 2017 study recorded no wild sightings of the bird in Sonora. Decline of the species has been attributed to intense livestock grazing in an ecosystem that does not rejuvenate quickly.

A captive flock was established in Arizona in the 1970s. The George Miksch Sutton Avian Research Center (Sutton Center) became involved with conservation efforts in 2017 to establish a breeding population at the Sutton Center in Oklahoma, in order to reintroduce birds to Buenos Aires National Wildlife Refuge (BANWR). In 2019, biologists from the Sutton Center transported 1,000 chicks by road vehicle to Buenos Aires National Wildlife Refuge. In 2020, a projected total of 1,200 birds will be transported by airplanes to BANWR. These recent actions are supplemental, and in addition to other conservation efforts in the past, seem to aid the subspecies' future conservation efforts.

== Relationship to humans ==
=== Introduced populations ===
==== Europe ====
Northern bobwhite were introduced for hunting into Italy in 1927, and are reported in the plains and hills in the north of the country, with small populations in the western Po Valley, and in the Italian-Slovenian-Croatian border area; reproductive success is low, and the populations are only maintained by releases of captive-bred birds. In France, a small but declining population persists in the Loire Valley, also dependent on continued releases. Introductions into Great Britain have been attempted on a number of occasions (first attempted in 1820), but have always failed, with the region's cold wet winter and spring weather cited as the main reason for failure.

==== New Zealand ====
From 1898 to 1902, some 1,300 birds were imported from America and released in many parts of the North and South Islands, from Northland to Southland. The bird was briefly on the Nelson game shooting licence, but: "It would seem that the committee was a little too eager in placing these Quail on the licence, or the shooters of the day were over-zealous and greedy in their bag limits, for the Virginian Quail, like the Mountain Quail were soon a thing of the past." The Taranaki (Acclimatisation) Society released a few in 1900 and was confidant that in a year or two they might offer good sport; two years later, broods were reported and the species was said to be steadily increasing; but after another two years they seemed to have disappeared and that was the end of them. The Otago (Acclimatisation) Society imported more in 1948, but these releases did no good. After 1923, no more genuinely wild birds were sighted until 1952, when a small population was found northwest of Wairoa in the Ruapapa Road area. Since then, bobwhite have been found at several localities around Waikaremoana, in farmland, open bush and along roadsides.

More birds have been imported into New Zealand by private individuals since the 1990s and a healthy captive population is now held by backyard aviculturists and have been found to be easily cared for and bred and are popular for their song and good looks. A larger proportion of the national captive population belong to a few game preserves and game bird breeders. Though the birds would be self-sustaining in the wild if they were protected; it is tricky to guess what the effect of an annual population subsidy and hunting has on any of the original populations from the Acclimatisation Society releases.

An albino hen was present in a covey in Bayview, Hawkes Bay for a couple of seasons sometime around 2000.

=== Captivity ===
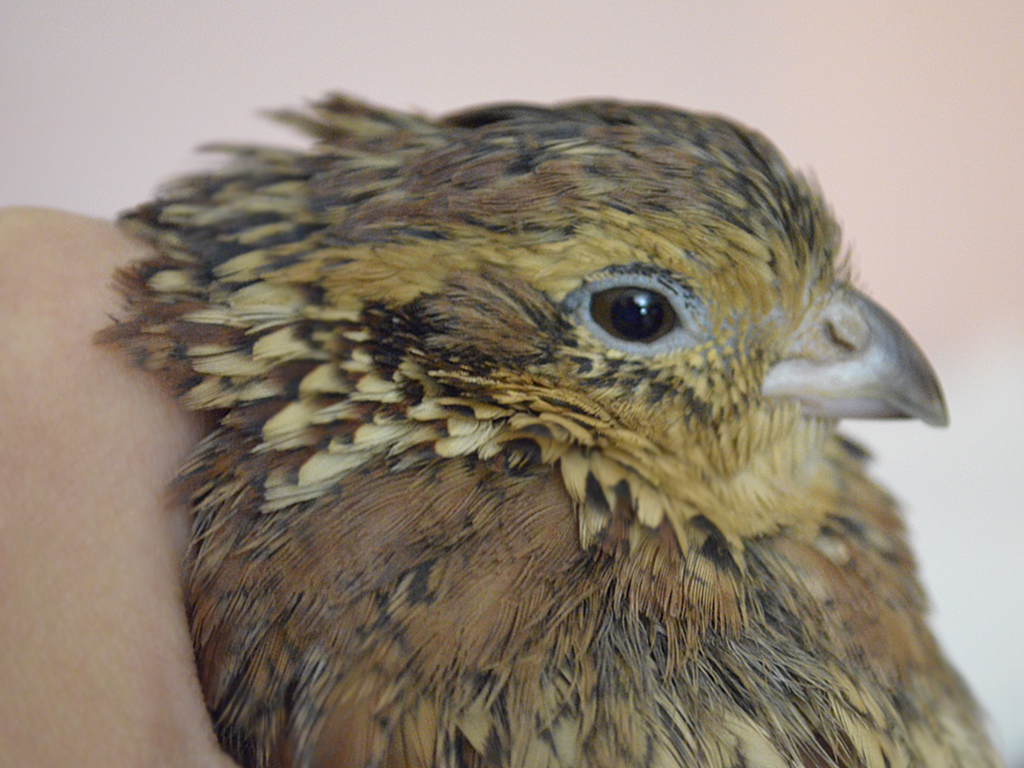
Domesticated northern bobwhite

==== Housing ====
Bobwhites are generally compatible with most parrots, softbills and doves. This species should, however, be the only ground-dwelling species in the aviary. Most individuals will do little damage to finches, but one should watch that nests are not being crushed when the species perches at night. Single pairs are preferred, unless the birds have been raised together as a group since they were chicks. Some fighting will occur between cocks at breeding time. One cock may be capable of breeding with several hens, but the fertility seems to be highest in the eggs from the preferred hen. Aviary style is a compromise between what is tolerated by the bird and what is best for the bird. Open parrot-style type aviaries may be used, but some birds will remain flighty and shy in this situation. In a planted aviary, this species will generally settle down to become quite tame and confiding. Parents with chicks will roost on the ground, forming a circular arrangement, with heads facing outwards. In the early morning and late afternoon, the cock will utter his call, which, although not loud, carries well and may offend noise-sensitive neighbors. Most breeding facilities keep birds in breeding groups on wire up off the ground.

==== Feeding ====
In the wild the northern bobwhite feeds on a variety of weed and grass seeds, as well as insects. These are generally collected on the ground or from low foliage. Birds in the aviary are easily catered for with a commercial small seed mix (finch, budgerigar, or small parrot mix) when supplemented with greenfeed. Live food is not usually necessary for breeding, but will be ravenously accepted. High protein foods such as chicken grower crumble are more convenient to supply and will be useful for the stimulation of breeding birds. Extra calcium is required, especially by laying hens; it can be supplied in the form of shell grit, or cuttlefish bone.

==== Breeding ====
If a nesting site and privacy are not provided, hens will lay anywhere within an open aviary. Hens that do this may, in a season, lay upwards of 80 eggs, which can be taken for artificial incubation and the chicks hand-raised. Hens with nesting cover that do make a nest (on the ground) will build up 8–25 eggs in a clutch, with eggs being laid daily.

==== Mutations and hybrids ====
Some captive bobwhite hybrids recorded are between blue quail (scaled quail), Gambel's quail, California quail, and mountain quail.

== In popular culture ==
In 2023, the masked bobwhite subspecies was featured on a United States Postal Service Forever stamp as part of the Endangered Species set, based on a photograph from Joel Sartore's Photo Ark. The stamp was dedicated at a ceremony at the National Grasslands Visitor Center in Wall, South Dakota.

== See also ==
- Quail hunting
