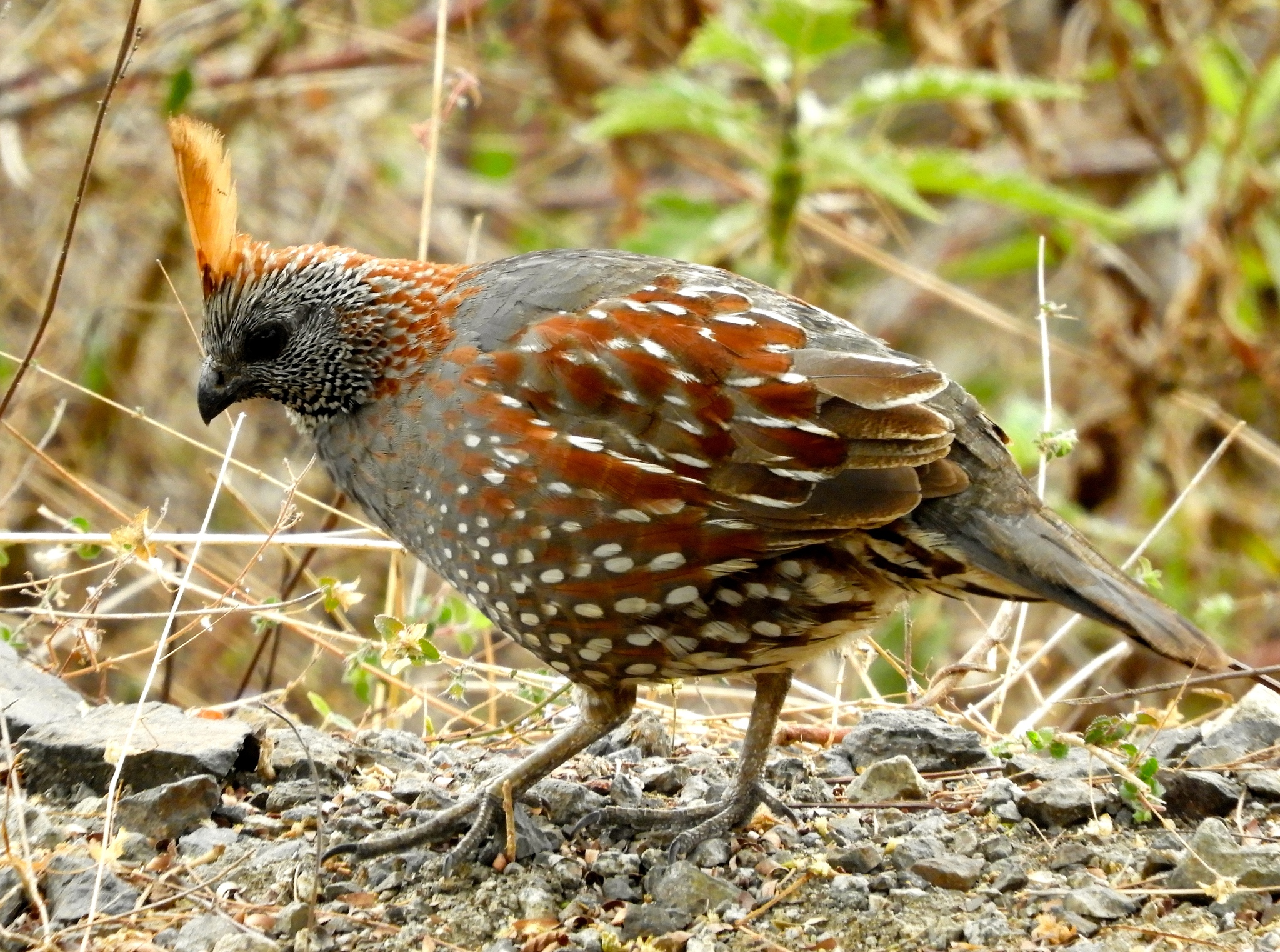

Conservation status
- Least Concern (IUCN 3.1)

Scientific classification
- Kingdom: Animalia
- Phylum: Chordata
- Class: Aves
- Order: Galliformes
- Family: Odontophoridae
- Genus: Callipepla
- Species: C. douglasii

Binomial name
- Callipepla douglasii (Vigors, 1829)

Synonyms
- Callipepla elegans

= Elegant quail =

Species of bird

The elegant quail (Callipepla douglasii) is a species of New World quail endemic to Pacific-slope thorn forest of north-western Mexico, from southern Sonora to Nayarit. These are common, mainly ground-dwelling birds, and the IUCN has rated them as being a "species of least concern".

== Description ==
female bird

The elegant quail grows to a length of about 25 cm (10 in). The male has a distinctive long, straight, golden-buff crest (the female's crest is brown). In other ways the sexes are similar in appearance, being mainly grey with spotting and streaking in black, brown and white, and in the case of the male, in reddish-brown as well. The beak is black, the irises are brown and the legs dark grey to black. This bird can be distinguished from the otherwise similar scaled quail (C. squamata), California quail (C. californica), and Gambel's quail (C. gambelii) by the colour of the male's crest and by the paler spotting on the flanks.

Vocalisations include a "chip-chip" call used by members of a covey to help them remain in contact as they feed on the ground by day, and a "cu-cow" call given on assembly at the roosting site in the evening, and again in the morning before setting off to forage.

== Distribution and habitat ==
Elegant quail are found only in Mexico, on the Pacific slopes of the Sierra Madre Occidental at altitudes of up to 1,000 m (3,300 ft). Their range extends from Sonora and southwestern Chihuahua to northern Jalisco and they are generally found in thorny scrub and deciduous forest, on open ground and cultivated fields. When disturbed they either freeze or run through the undergrowth, taking to the wing only with reluctance.

== Status ==
The elegant quail has a wide range with an area of occupation estimated at 118,000 km^{2} (45,560 mi^{2}). It is a common bird and its population is thought to be rising as degradation of the forest creates the open areas it likes. The International Union for Conservation of Nature has rated its conservation status as being of "least concern".
