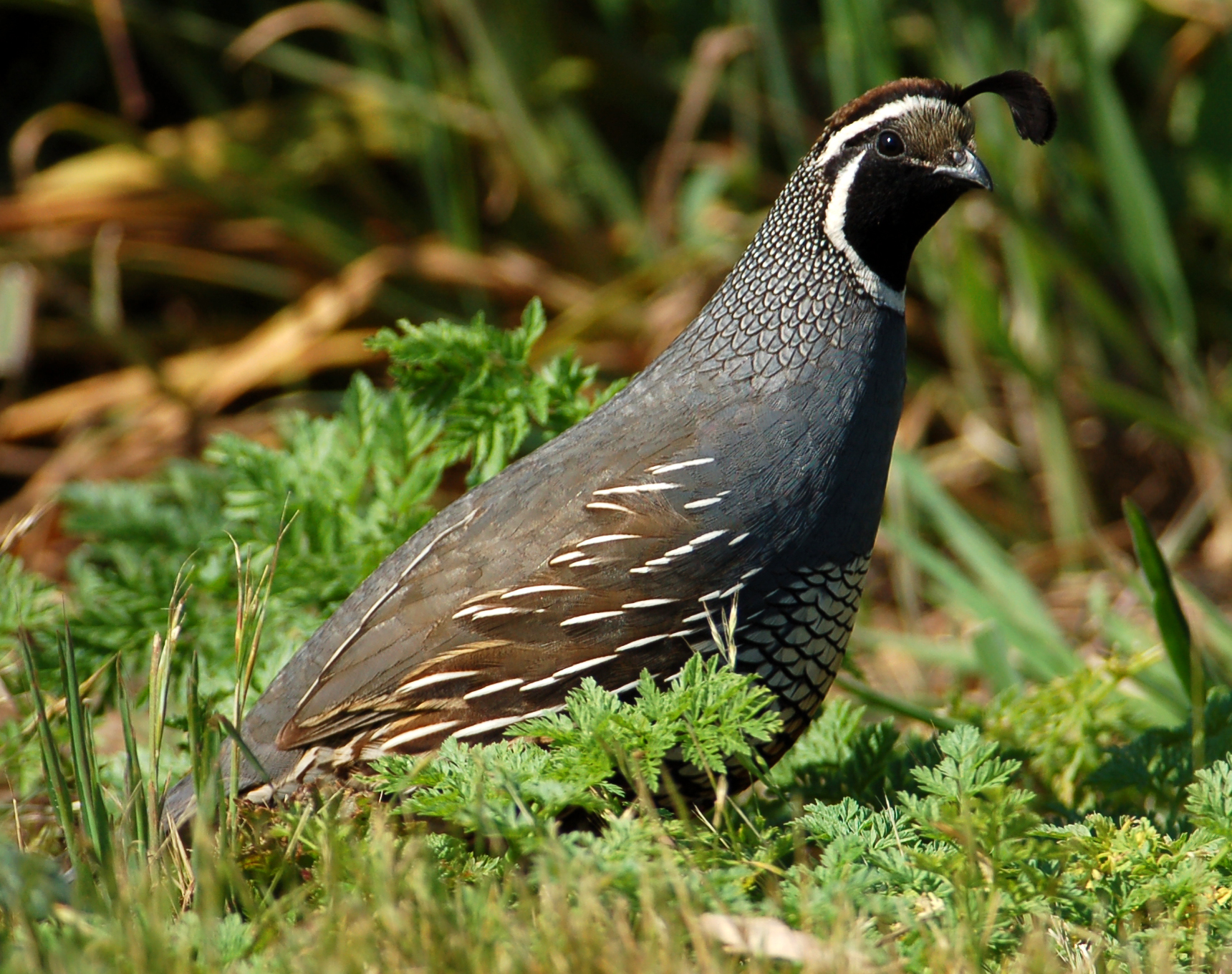
- Callipepla californica

Scientific classification
- Kingdom: Animalia
- Phylum: Chordata
- Class: Aves
- Order: Galliformes
- Family: Odontophoridae
- Genus: Callipepla; Wagler, 1832

Type species
- Callipepla strenua Wagler, 1832

Species
- Callipepla californica Callipepla douglasii Callipepla gambelii Callipepla squamata

Synonyms
- Lophortyx Bonaparte, 1838

= Callipepla =

Genus of birds

Callipepla is a genus of birds in the New World quail family, Odontophoridae. They are sometimes referred to as crested quails.

== Species ==
Genus Callipepla – Wagler, 1832 – four species
Common name	Scientific name and subspecies	Range	Size and ecology	IUCN status and estimated population
California quail Male Female	Callipepla californica (Shaw, 1798) Seven subspecies: C. c. californica (Shaw, 1798); C. c. achrustera (Peters, 1923); C. c. brunnescens (Ridgway, 1884); C. c. canfieldae (Van Rossem, 1939); C. c. catalinensis (Grinnell, 1906); C. c. orecta (Oberholser, 1932); C. c. plumbea (Grinnell, 1926)	Southwestern United States to the Pacific Northwest, British Columbia, Canada	Size: Habitat: Diet:	LC
Elegant quail Male	Callipepla douglasii (Vigors, 1829)	Sonora and southwestern Chihuahua to northern Jalisco, Mexico	Size: Habitat: Diet:	LC
Gambel's quail Male Female	Callipepla gambelii (Gambel, 1843) Two subspecies: C. g. fulvipectus (Nelson, 1899); C. g. gambelii (Gambel, 1843)	Arizona, California, Colorado, New Mexico, Nevada, Utah, Texas, and Sonora; also New Mexico-border Chihuahua and the Colorado River region of Baja California.	Size: Habitat: Diet:	LC
Scaled quail Male Female	Callipepla squamata (Vigors, 1830) Four subspecies: C. s. squamata Vigors, 1830; C. s. pallida Brewster, 1881; C. s. hargravei Rea, 1973; C. s. castanogastris Brewster, 1883	South-central Arizona, northern New Mexico, east-central Colorado, and southwestern Kansas south through western Oklahoma and western and central Texas into Mexico to northeastern Jalisco, Guanajuato, Queretaru, Hidalgo, and western Tamaulipas	Size: Habitat: Diet:	LC
