= Softbill =

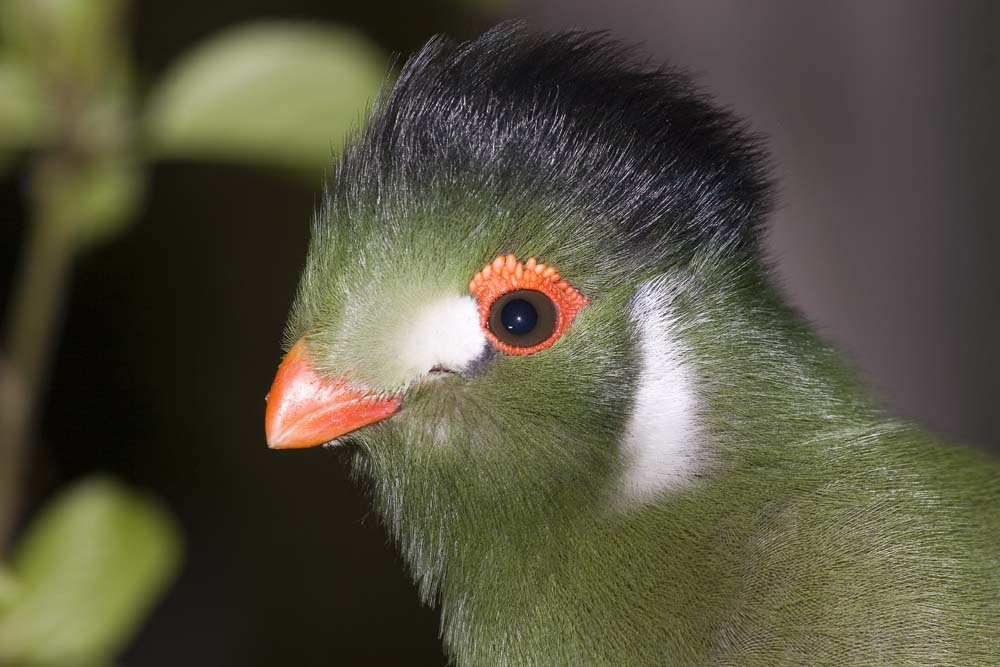
An example of a softbill

Softbill is a non-scientific term that has been used in aviculture for numerous years to describe a diverse range of bird species based upon their dietary habits. It has no fixed taxonomic meaning and can be misleading, as many species that fall into the category do not have a soft bill at all. Softbills are also referred to as such in aviculture to differentiate them from another commonly-kept group of birds, the hookbills - i.e. the parrots.

The proper use of the term is in reference to the ‘soft food’ diets which typically fall into the following six categories:

- Carnivorous – those that feed on small mammals, birds or other vertebrates (e.g. kingfishers, rollers)
- Insectivorous – those that feed on insects and other invertebrates (e.g. bee-eaters, flycatchers)
- Omnivorous – those that feed on both animal and plant material (e.g. Corvids, hornbills)
- Frugivorous – those that feed on fruit (e.g. turacos, fruit doves)
- Nectarivorous – those that feed on flower nectar (e.g. hummingbirds, sunbirds)
- Folivorous – those that feed on leaves, petals and other plant material (turacos, mousebirds)

This sixth diet type is usually in association with one of the above, as very few birds are solely folivorous. Several species of Galliformes are folivores, however they are not considered to be softbills.

A more recent definition by Clive Roots is, “Cage and aviary birds with relatively soft bills, which feed upon insects* and soft plant material and whose young are helpless at birth”.

- including other larger animal prey

This latter definition does discriminate against a few species, however as can be seen, the definition is very subjective and can encompass numerous species not generally included in the group.
