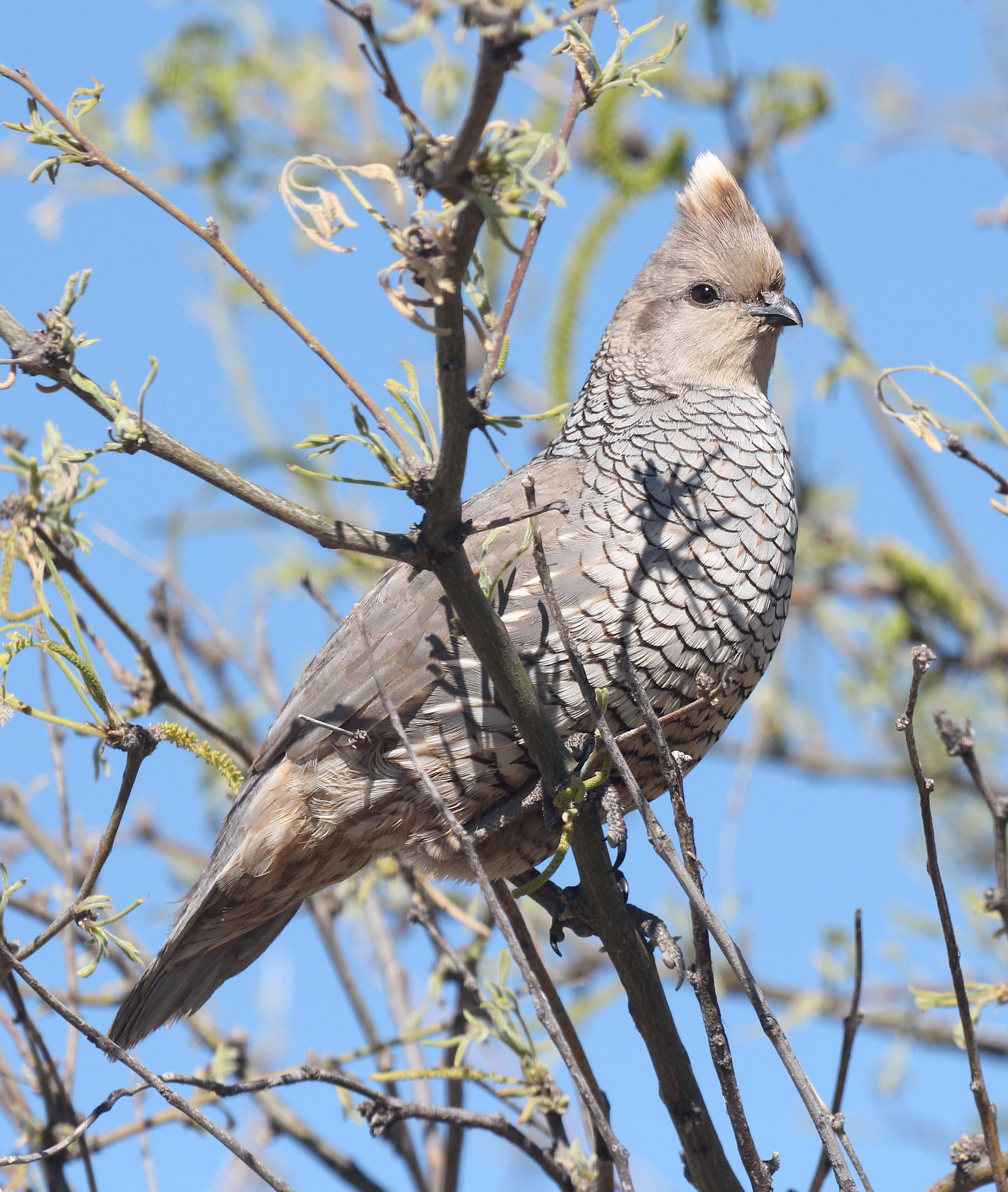
- Scaled quail in Arizona

Conservation status
- Least Concern (IUCN 3.1)

Scientific classification
- Kingdom: Animalia
- Phylum: Chordata
- Class: Aves
- Order: Galliformes
- Family: Odontophoridae
- Genus: Callipepla
- Species: C. squamata

Binomial name
- Callipepla squamata (Vigors, 1830)

Subspecies
- See text

Synonyms
- Ortyx squamatus Vigors, 1830

= Scaled quail =

Species of bird

The scaled quail (Callipepla squamata), also commonly called blue quail or cottontop, is a species of the New World quail family. It is a bluish gray bird found in the arid regions of the Southwestern United States to Central Mexico. This species is an early offshoot of the genus Callipepla, diverging in the Pliocene.

The nest is typically a grass-lined hollow containing 9–16 speckled eggs. When disturbed, it prefers to run rather than fly.

Widespread and common throughout its range, the scaled quail is evaluated as Least Concern on the IUCN Red List of Threatened Species.

== Distribution and taxonomy ==
Scaled quail occur from south-central Arizona, northern New Mexico, east-central Colorado, and southwestern Kansas south through western Oklahoma and western and central Texas into Mexico to northeastern Jalisco, Guanajuato, Queretaro, Hidalgo, and western Tamaulipas. It has been introduced to Cuba, Jamaica, Haiti, Dominican Republic, Puerto Rico and to the United States in Hawaii, central Washington, eastern Nevada, and Nebraska, but is only considered established in central Washington and eastern Nevada.

Scaled quail has formed several subspecies, 3 of which range into the USA:

- Callipepla squamata squamata Vigors, 1830 (Altiplano scaled quail). The nominate subspecies; it is only found on the Central Plateau (altiplano) of Mexico.
- Callipepla squamata pallida Brewster, 1881 (northern scaled quail). The most common subspecies, it occurs from Arizona and New Mexico to Colorado and just into Oklahoma, and western Texas, northern Chihuahua, and Sonora. It is paler than the nominate subspecies.
- Callipepla squamata hargravei Rea, 1973 (Upper Sonoran scaled quail). A form of arid habitat, it is only found in the area where the states of Colorado, Kansas and Oklahoma meet, and in northwestern New Mexico. It is the palest subspecies, adapted to dry and sandy habitat.
- Callipepla squamata castanogastris Brewster, 1883 (chestnut-bellied scaled quail). Found in southern Texas from Eagle Pass and San Antonio south to adjacent northwestern Mexico (Coahuila, Nuevo León, and Tamaulipas). Similar individuals are sometimes found in the extreme northeast and west of the species' range. The chestnut brown belly distinguishes it from all other subspecies; it is also darker than the other two found in the USA.

== Description ==
This bird is named for the scaly appearance of its breast and back feathers. Along with its scaly markings, the bird is easily identified by its white crest that resembles a tuft of cotton.

It typically measures 25.4–30.5 cm (10.0–12.0 in) in length, 38 cm (15 in) in wingspan, and weighs 177–191 g (6.2–6.7 oz).

== Plant communities ==
According to Ligon, the distribution of scaled quail is largely coextensive with mesquite (Prosopis spp.), condalia (Condalia spp.), and cholla (Cylindropuntia spp.).

In Oklahoma, scaled quail occur in sand sagebrush (Artemisia filifolia)-grassland, pinyon-juniper (Pinus spp.-Juniperus spp.), and shortgrass High Plains. Sand sagebrush-grasslands include sand sagebrush, soapweed yucca (Yucca glauca), skunkbush sumac (Rhus trilobata), and sand plum (Prunus watsonii). Scaled Quail in Oklahoma inhabit rough or rolling land, especially where sagebrush (Artemisia spp.), mesquite, cactus (Opuntia spp. and others), yucca (Yucca spp.), juniper, sand shinnery oak (Quercus havardii), and rocks furnish cover.

In Colorado, scaled quail occupy sand sagebrush and/or yucca stands on sandy soils. The cover types used by scaled quail in Colorado are, in descending order, sand sagebrush-grassland, pinyon-juniper, dense cholla-grassland, dryland farmland, irrigated farmland, and greasewood (Sarcobatus spp.)-saltbush (Atriplex spp.) washes. Scaled Quail made little or no use of sparse cholla-grassland, riparian areas, reseeded grasslands, or shortgrass prairie disclimax.

== Timing of major life events ==
In Arizona, pairing and maximum dispersal is complete by mid-June. Nesting probably does not begin until early July. In Oklahoma, egg laying usually starts in late April. Completed clutches have been found as early as May 8. Egg laying occurs from March to June in Texas and Mexico, and from April to September in New Mexico. Nests with eggs were reported as early as April 15 in New Mexico.

Scaled quail lay from 9 to 16 eggs; most clutches are 12 to 14 eggs. These eggs measure 3.09–3.26 cm (1.22–1.28 in) in length and 2.43–2.51 cm (0.96–0.99 in) in width. Eggs are incubated by the female for 21 to 23 days. Double-brooding (the production of two consecutive broods in one season) is common. In west Texas, Wallmo observed the male rearing the first brood while the female began a second clutch. Sutton stated, however, that scaled quail in Oklahoma are probably single-brooded, but have hatched broods as late as September 6. Ehrlich and others also list scaled quail as single-brooded.

The precocial young leave the nest shortly after hatching. They are accompanied by at least one, usually both, parents, who show them how to find food. The young fledge rapidly (age at fledging not reported in the literature), and are adult size in 11 to 15 weeks.

Scaled quail are fairly sedentary. The winter home ranges of scaled quail coveys varied from 24 to 84 acres (9.7 to 34.0 ha). The home ranges of separate coveys overlap only slightly or not at all. From September to November scaled quail coveys maintain stable territories. In Arizona, 75 to 90% of a population apparently moved off of a breeding area by mid-November, moving to nearby mountain foothills. The mountain habitat was consistent with that found on the breeding area. In March the population on the breeding area increased again, with most birds in groups of four to eight.

The average winter covey size for scaled quail is around 30 birds, although coveys of up to 150 birds have been reported.

== Preferred habitat ==
Scaled quail inhabit dry, open valleys, plains, foothills, rocky slopes, draws, gullies, and canyons that have a mixture of bare ground, low herbaceous growth, and scattered brushy cover. Good scaled quail habitat is characterized by low-growing grasses with forbs and shrubs. Overall ground cover is between 10 and 50%. Trees and shrubs should be less than 6.6 feet (2.0 m) tall. Scaled quail avoid the dense growth associated with streamsides. Transmitter-fitted scaled quail had individual home range sizes of 52 and 60 acres (21 and 24 ha).

An absolute requirement by scaled quail for a source of open water has not been established; there is some debate in the literature whether there is such a requirement. Scaled quail have been reported as inhabiting an area 7 or 8 miles (11 or 13 kilometres) from the nearest water in Arizona. In New Mexico, it was not unusual to find Scaled Quail 10 to 15 miles (16 to 24 kilometres) from water. Wallmo observed winter coveys 3 and 7 miles (4.8 and 11.3 kilometres) from water in Big Bend National Park in southwestern Texas.

In Arizona, scaled quail summer habitat is seldom within 660 feet (200 m) of water. Scaled quail were observed drinking at stock tanks from April to June (which was a dry period during the course of the study) every 2 to 3 days. In Oklahoma, scaled quail often migrate to farms and ranches in winter and are thus closer to a source of water in winter than in summer. DeGraaf and others reported that in winter, scaled quail are usually found within 1.25 miles (2.01 km) of a source of water.

== Cover requirements ==
Feeding cover: scaled quail use grass clumps and shrubs for cover while feeding. In one study they were frequently seen crossing 82 to 165 feet (25 to 50 metres) of bare ground. When disturbed, scaled quail hid in snakeweed (Gutierrezia spp.) or in grass clumps. In June and July foraging occurs on open grasslands which are not used at other times.

Loafing cover: scaled quail coveys occupy loafing or resting cover after early morning feeding periods. Scaled quail occupy desert grassland or desert scrub with a minimum of one loafing covert per approximately 70 acres (28 hectares). In northwestern Texas, loafing coverts were characterized by: (1) overhead woody cover, (2) lateral screening cover, (3) a central area with bare soil, and (4) one or more paths through the lateral cover. Covert heights ranged from 1.6 to 5.9 feet (0.49 to 1.80 m) high and 2.6 to 6.9 feet (0.79 to 2.10 m) in diameter. Cholla formed all or part of the overhead cover of 85% of coverts, even though they were dominant at only 12% of the study locations. In areas where scaled quail occur without cholla, woody species such as wolfberry (Lycium spp.) and mesquite are important for overhead cover. In Oklahoma pinyon-juniper habitats, scaled quail use the shade of tree cholla (Cylindropuntia imbricata) and human-made structures. In Arizona, scaled quail occupied wolfberry and mesquite 1.7 to 5 feet (0.52 to 1.52 m) tall for loafing cover. This overhead cover provides midday shade, but is open at the base to allow easy escape from predators. In Oklahoma, winter home ranges always contained skunkbush sumac, tree cholla, or human-made structures providing overhead cover.

Night-roosting cover: scaled quail roosts were observed in yucca (Yucca angustifolia), tree cholla, and true mountain-mahogany (Cercocarpus montanus)-yucca-fragrant sumac (Rhus aromatica) vegetation types. The height of vegetation used for night roosts was less than 1.6 feet (0.49 m).

Nesting cover: In March or April winter coveys spread out into areas with less cover. This use of areas with less cover coincides with a seasonal decrease in the number of raptors in the same area. Scaled quail nests are constructed under tufts of grasses, and are sheltered by sagebrush (Artemisia spp.), creosotebush (Larrea tridentata), mesquite, catclaw acacia (Acacia greggii), cactus, or yucca; under dead Russian-thistle (Salsola kali), mixed forbs, or soapweed yucca; or sheltered in old machinery or other human-made debris. In Oklahoma, 66% of nests were in one of four situations: (1) dead Russian-thistle, (2) machinery and junk, (3) mixed forbs, and (4) soapweed yucca. In New Mexico, ordination of breeding birds and vegetative microhabitats indicated that scaled quail were associated with increased levels of patchiness and increased cover of mesquite and cactus.

== Food habits ==
Scaled quail are opportunistic eaters. Seeds are consumed year-round. Large seeds (such as those of mesquite and snakeweed) are important in Scaled quail diets. Other seeds include those of elbowbush (Forestiera angustifolia), catclaw acacia, mesquite, hackberry (Celtis spp.), Russian-thistle, rough pigweed (Amaranthus retroflexus), and sunflowers, ragweeds (Ambrosia spp.), and other Asteraceous plants. Scaled quail consume more grass seeds than do other quail species. Other dietary components include leaves, fruits, and insects. Summer diets are high in green vegetation and insects, which are also important sources of moisture.

In Oklahoma, small groups of scaled quail feed among soapweed yucca and in soapweed yucca-sand sagebrush ranges, weed patches, and grain stubble. Also in Oklahoma, early winter foods apparently eaten when other foods are not available included snow-on-the-mountain (Euphorbia marginata), sand paspalum (Paspalum stramineum), field sandbur (Cenchrus pauciflorus), purslane (Portulaca spp.), skunkbush sumac, Fendler spurge (Euphorbia fendleri), and leaf bugs. Jimsonweed (Datura stramonium) and juniper berries were always avoided. Winter foods of the scaled quail in Oklahoma include Russian-thistle and sunflower (Helianthus spp.) seeds.

In northwestern Texas, selection of foods by scaled quail was dependent on foraging techniques, availability, and seed size. Small seeds were selected when they were still on the plant and could be easily stripped, but were not eaten once they had fallen, presumably because they were too small and/or too hard to find. Broom snakeweed (Gutierrezia sarothrae) was a staple in winter diets; it was not highly selected but was consumed in proportion to its availability (and lack of availability of choice items). Generally, in Texas grass seeds (mainly tall dropseed [Sporobolus asper] and rough tridens [Tridens muticus]) were major constituents of scaled quail diets. This was attributed to a precipitation pattern that resulted in a relatively higher amount of grass seed available, and a lower amount of available forbs. In the same study green vegetation formed a higher proportion of the diet than reported for other areas.

In southwestern Texas, chestnut-bellied scaled quail consumed woody plant seeds and green vegetation. The seeds of brush species comprised 68% of the contents of 32 scaled quail crops. Green food, chiefly wild carrot (Daucus carota) and clover (Trifolium spp.) made up 7.17%. Elbowbush was the single most important source, followed by Roemer acacia (Acacia roemeriana), desert-yaupon (Schaefferia cuneifolia), and spiny hackberry (Celtis pallida).

In southeastern New Mexico, staples (comprising at least 5% of scaled quail diet in both summer and winter) were mesquite and croton (Croton spp.) seeds, green vegetation, and snout beetles. Nonpreferred foods eaten in winter and available but not consumed in summer included broom snakeweed (the main winter food), crown-beard (Verbesina encelioides), cycloloma (Cycloloma atriplicifolium), and lace bugs. Mesquite seeds and broom snakeweed seeds together made up 75% of the winter diet. Grasshoppers were a summer staple. Insect galls, cicadas, scarab beetles, spurge (Euphorbia spp.), plains bristlegrass (Setaria macrostachya) seeds, and white ratany (Krameria grayi) were consumed in a less pronounced seasonal pattern. Another study reported substantial amounts of prairie sunflower seeds (Helianthus petiolaris) and pigweed (Amaranthus spp.) seeds in the diet of scaled quail.

Scaled quail feed in alfalfa (Medicago spp.) fields.

== Predators ==
In Arizona, potential scaled quail predators include mammals, birds, and reptiles. Most scaled quail kills are made by avian predators including northern harrier (Circus cyaneus), red-tailed hawk (Buteo jamaicensis), American kestrel (Falco sparverius), prairie falcon (Falco mexicanus), and great horned owl (Bubo virginianus). In New Mexico, predators on scaled quail include hawks, owls, coyote (Canis latrans), and snakes. In Colorado, potential predators of scaled quail include coyote, gray fox (Urocyon cinereoargenteus), red fox (Vulpes vulpes), kit fox (V. velox), bobcat (Lynx rufus), northern harrier, rough-legged hawk (Buteo lagopus), prairie falcon, peregrine falcon (Falco peregrinus), American kestrel, golden eagle (Aquila chrysaetos), and bald eagle (Haliaeetus leucocephalus).

Scaled quail are popular gamebirds.
