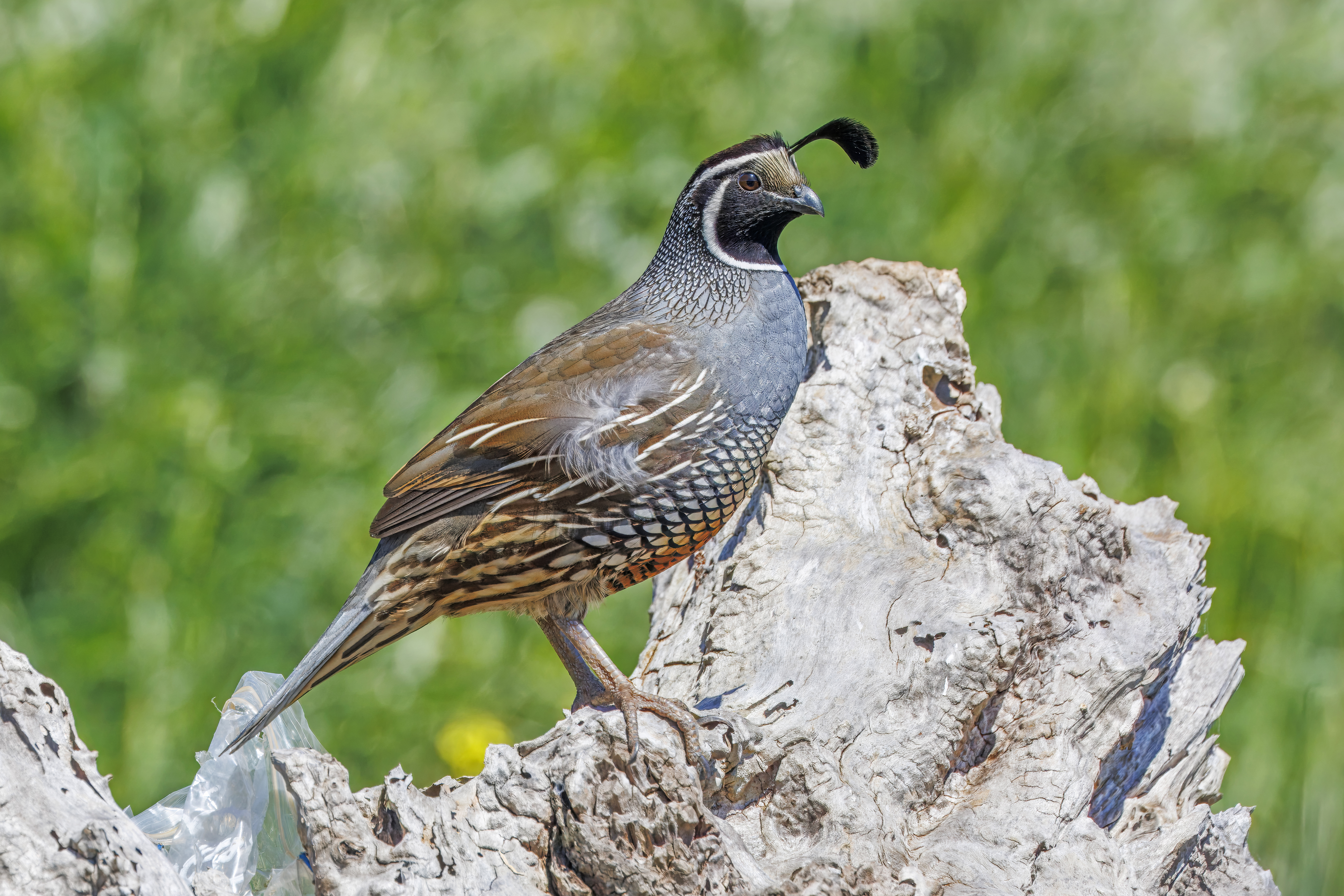
- Adult male
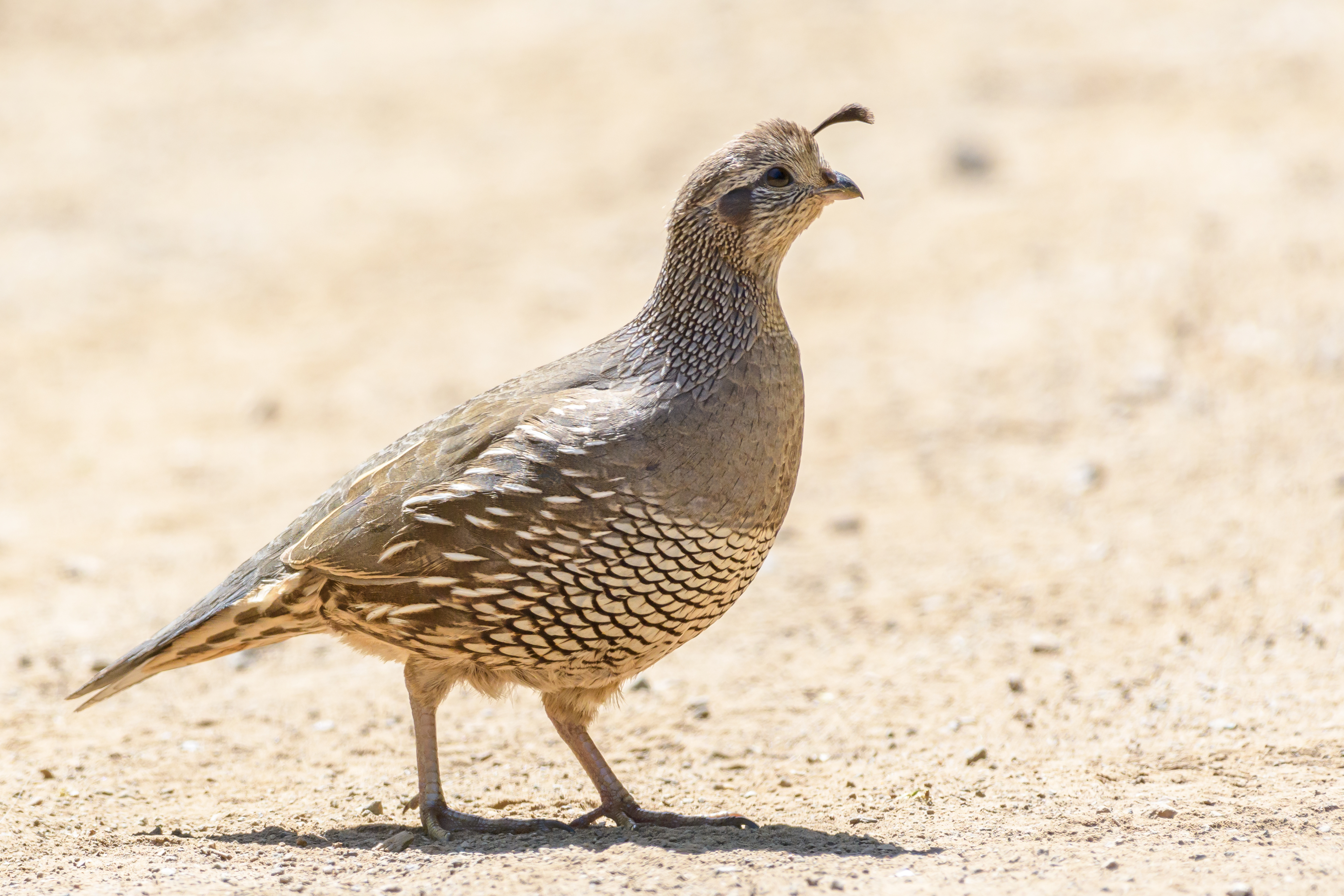
- Adult female

Conservation status
- Least Concern (IUCN 3.1)

- Secure (NatureServe)

Scientific classification
- Kingdom: Animalia
- Phylum: Chordata
- Class: Aves
- Order: Galliformes
- Family: Odontophoridae
- Genus: Callipepla
- Species: C. californica

Binomial name
- Callipepla californica (Shaw, 1798)
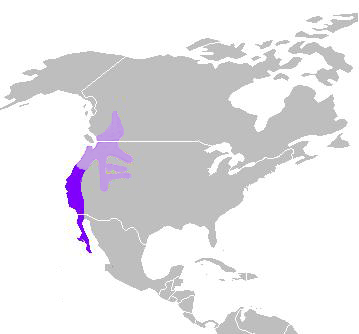
- Range of C. californica. Dark purple: native Light purple: introduced

Audio

= California quail =

Species of ground-dwelling bird

The California quail (Callipepla californica) is formally known as (Lophortyx californicus californicus) and also known as the California valley quail or Valley quail. It is a small ground-dwelling bird in the New World quail family and inhabits much of western North America. The California quail was established as the state bird of California in 1931.

== Taxonomy ==
=== Subspecies ===
There are seven recognized subspecies:

- C. c. californica (Shaw, 1798) – northern Oregon and western Nevada to southern California and Coronado Islands

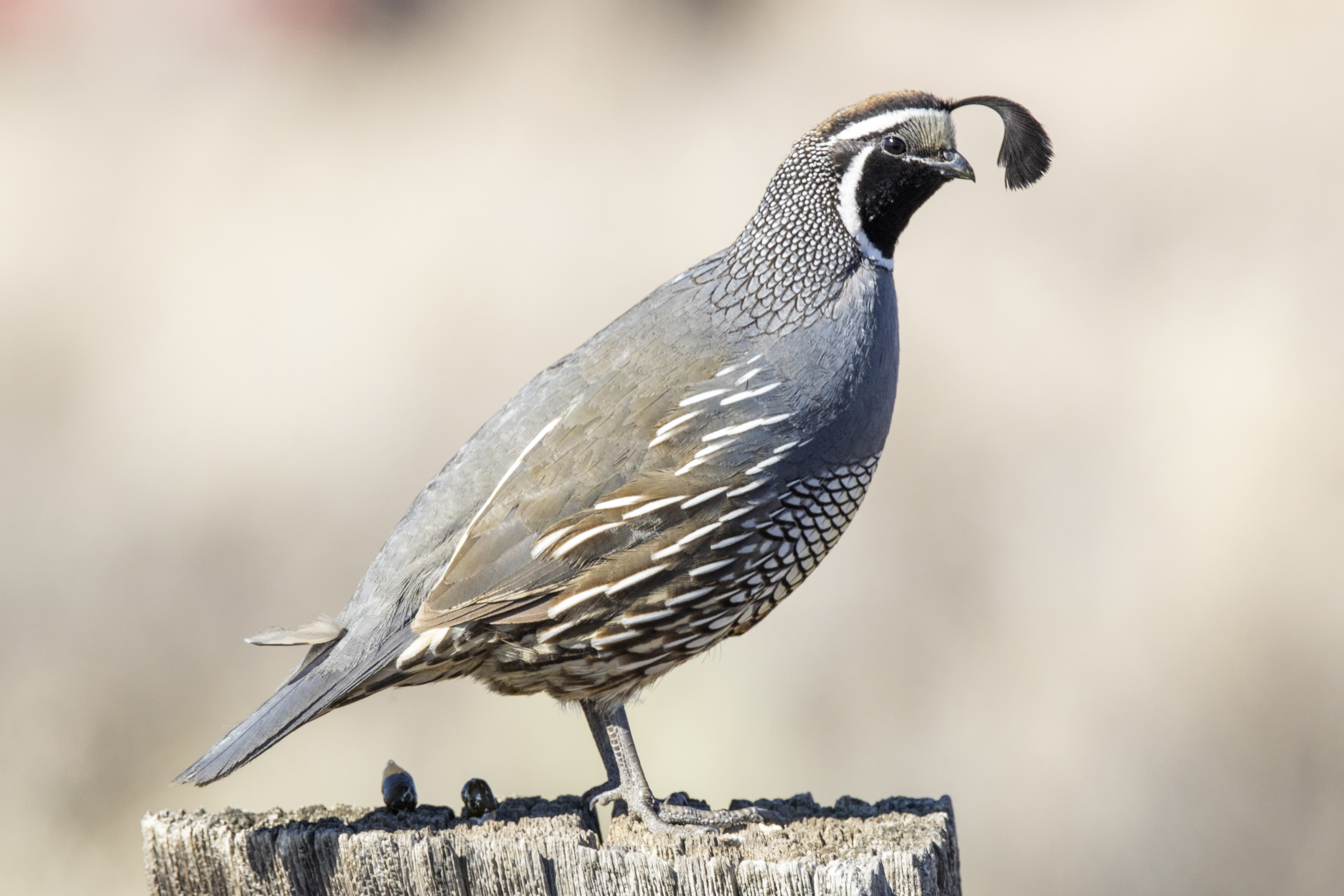
Male C. c. californica in Susanville, California

- C. c. achrustera (Peters, 1923) – San Lucas California quail – southern Baja California

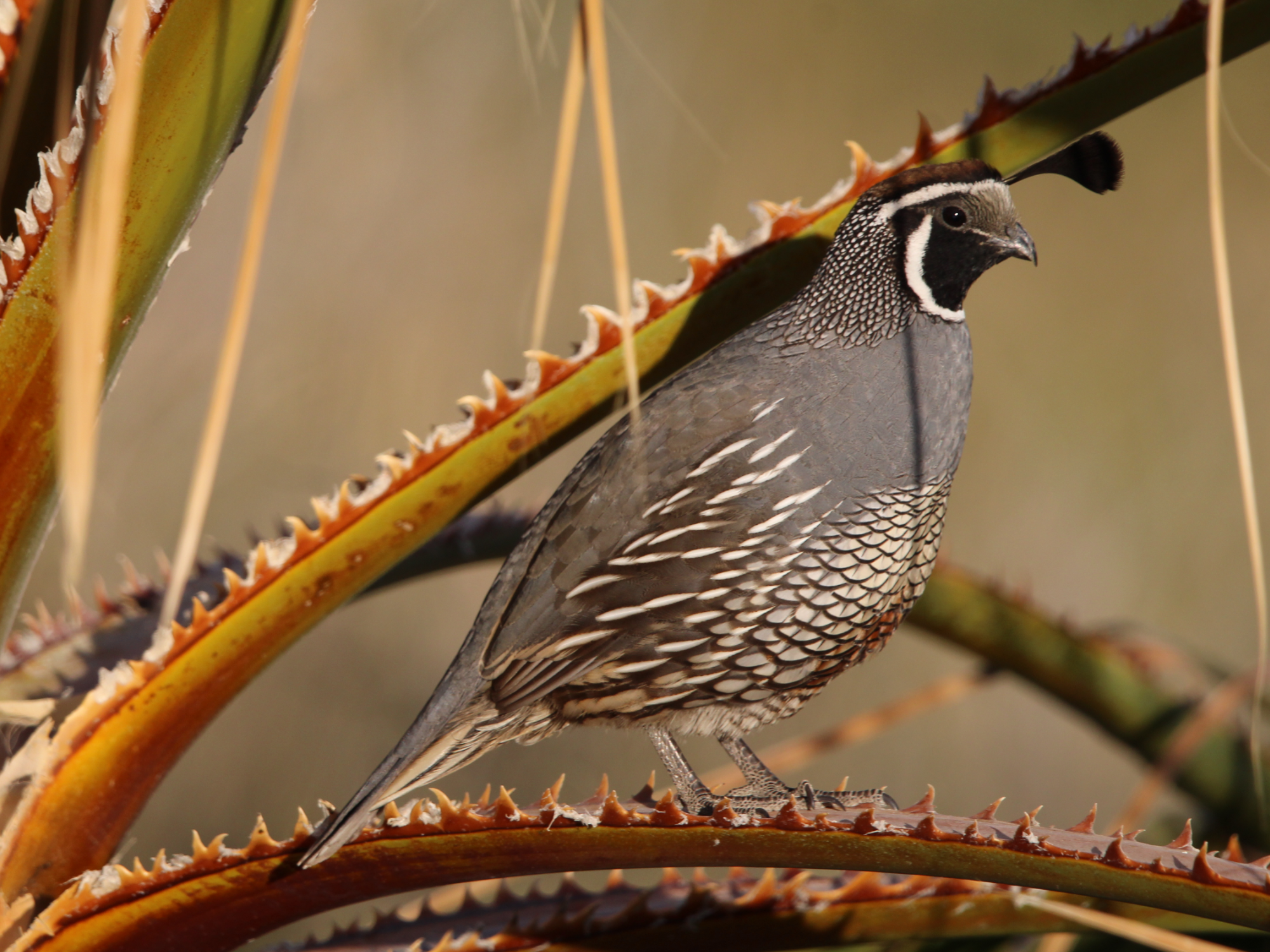
Male C. c. achrustera in La Ventana, Baja California Sur, Mexico.

- C. c. brunnescens (Ridgway, 1884) – extreme northern coastal California to southern Santa Cruz County
- C. c. canfieldae (Van Rossem, 1939) – Owen Valley quail – Owens Valley of east central California
- C. c. catalinensis (Grinnell, 1906) – Santa Catalina quail – Santa Catalina Island (off southern California)
- C. c. orecta (Oberholser, 1932) – Warner Valley quail – Warner Valley in Oregon to extreme northern California
- C. c. plumbea (Grinnell, 1926) – San Quintin California quail – San Diego County to southern Baja California

=== Related species ===
Their closest relative is Gambel's quail, which has a more southerly distribution and a longer crest at 2.5 in (6.4 cm), a brighter head and lacks the scaly appearance of the California quail. The two species separated about 1–2 million years ago, during the Late Pliocene or Early Pleistocene.

== Description ==
The Valley California quail has the former trinomial latin name of Lophortyx californicus californicus. The scientific name was changed to Callipepla californica by the American Ornithologists Union after 1973.

These birds have a curving crest, plume or topknot, longer in males than females. Adult males are gray and brown colored, with a black face outlined by white stripes. Females are a plainer brown color and do not have the facial stripes. In terms of size, this bird typically measures 24–27 cm (9.4–10.6 in) in length, 32–37 cm (13–15 in) in wingspan, and weigh 140–230 g (4.9–8.1 oz).

== Behavior and population ==
The California quail is a highly sociable bird that usually gathers in flocks of 40 and "coveys" in the fall and winter. These flocks preserve their social bonds while also providing mutual protection. They are the most temperate adapted species in the entire Odontophoridae family.

If startled, these birds explode into short rapid flight, called "flushing". Given a choice, they will normally escape on foot. The California quail has 11 distinct bird calls for various situations. Aggregation and contact calls include: Cu-ca-cow (assembly call), and Ut-ut (conversational), Tu-tu (food call). Alarm calls include: Pit-pit (alarm note), Kurr (fright), Pseu-pseu (distress), and Put-put (warning). Agonistic and sexual calls include: Cow (male mating), Sneeze (hostility), Wip-wip (male aggression). Parental calls include: Mo-mo-mo (calling to scattered chicks).

The California quail forages on the ground, often scratching at the soil. They can sometimes be seen feeding at the sides of roads. Their diet consists mainly of seeds and leaves, but they also eat some berries and insects; for example, Toyon berries are a common food source.

The California quail can survive indefinitely without water if the majority of their food is succulent, but consistent consumption of dried seeds may cause them to lose weight.

These quails are year-round residents. Although this bird coexists well at the edges of urban areas, it is declining in some areas as human populations increase. This quail is historically hunted, and therefore less common than it once was (prior to the 1970s).

They were originally found mainly in the southwestern United States but they have been introduced into other areas including British Columbia, Hawaii, Chile, Uruguay, Brazil, Argentina, Peru, South Africa, New Zealand, and to Norfolk Island and King Island in Australia. The California Quail is now mainly found scattered throughout the more temperate climates of North America. The vast ancestral range of this quail extends just above 1300 miles north to south and 300 miles west to east. This range results in distinctive eco-types and different adaptations of the California quail to different habitats.

Due to their historic desert living, the California quail can adapt to short term body temperature increase of up to four degrees centigrade above normal levels of toleration. This bird is unable to withstand the absence of the warmth and dryness found in their native desert territory.

== Breeding ==
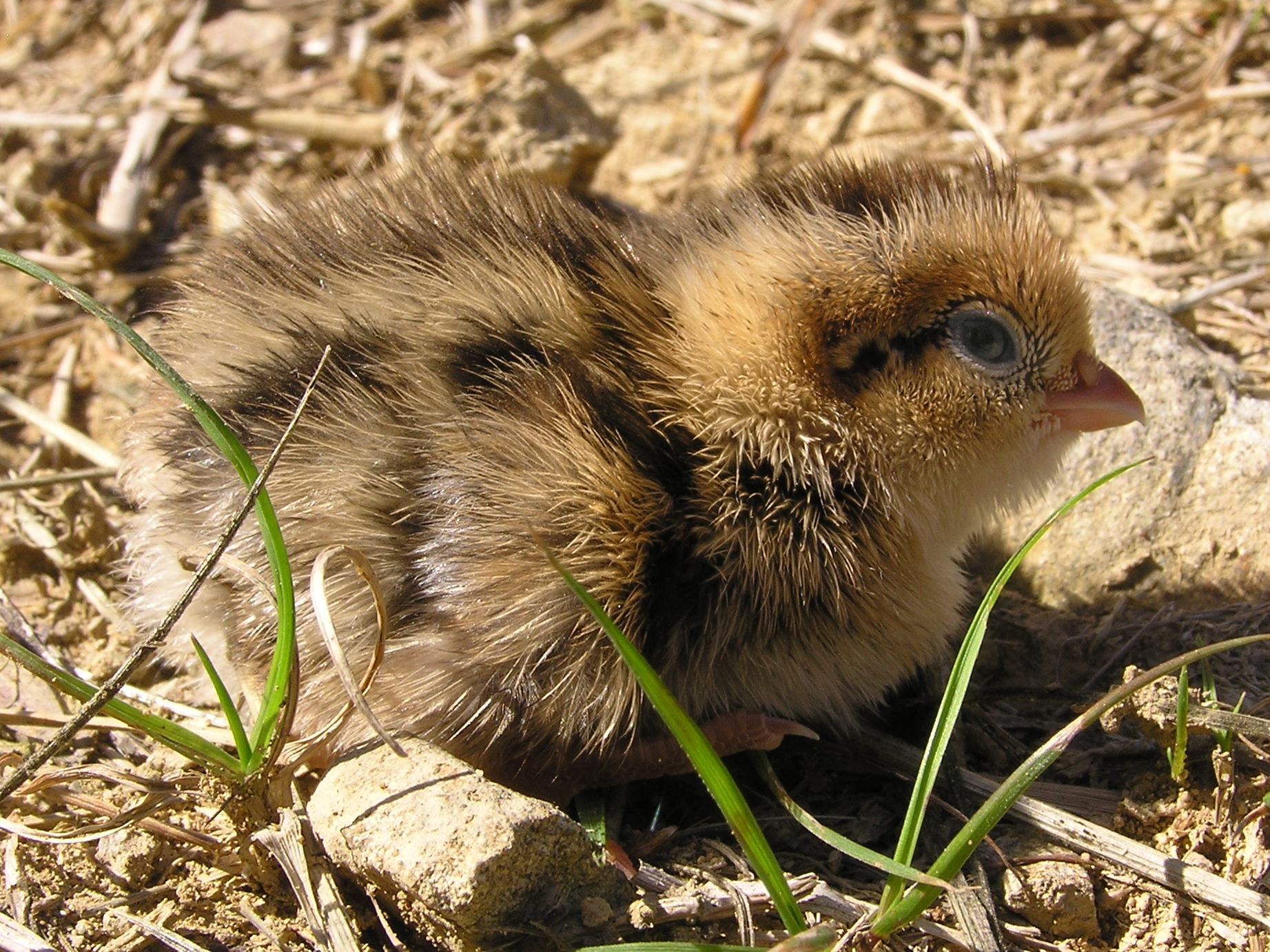
A chick in Wellington, New Zealand (introduced species)

Their breeding habitat is shrubby areas and open woodlands in western North America. The nest is a shallow scrape lined with vegetation on the ground beneath a shrub or other cover.

In March, this quail can get particularly hostile during pair-forming or pair-bonding leading up to copulation. In the beginning of May, separation into pairs becomes evident and fights between and within the female and male genders of the California Quail may occur until pairs are finalized for breeding. Excess unmated males often remain after pairing, so they make loud "cow" calls. These calls are common among other species of Callipepla, like the Grey partridge. New World Quails make calls for territorial purposes, unlike Old World Quails.

Unfavorable breeding seasons for the California Quail usually occur in North America's more temperate zones causing dry years where no breeding occurs. These periodic non-breeding seasons occur within other species of Callipepla as well.

During the breeding months of spring all the way into late summer, it is probable that the California Quail will make up to three nesting attempts. This quail averages 1.1–1.4 days per egg.

The female usually lays 12–16 eggs, measuring 3.2 cm (1.3 in) in length and 2.5 cm (0.98 in) in width.

There are firm social groupings within the California quail families. When the young emerge, they remain bonded to their parents until they are able to reproduce. The California quail matures during their first year with the early attainment of their adult plumages.

Double-brooding within the captive or wild California quail may occur once or twice per decade in highly favorable breeding summers. This may be due to the fact that the male California quail participates largely in the rearing of their young. The male California quail often aids in the incubation of their unhatched eggs, even if the female is unable to help.

== State bird ==
The California quail is the state bird of California. It was established as the state bird in 1931.

The quail population has fluctuated significantly throughout California. Once plentiful in San Francisco, by 2017 only one California quail remained in the city. Local birders named the male bird Ishi after the last known member of California's Native American Yahi tribe. Quail were likely introduced to Santa Catalina Island about 12,000 years ago by Native Americans, and there is a minimal genetic difference between the island and the mainland quail populations.

== Gallery ==
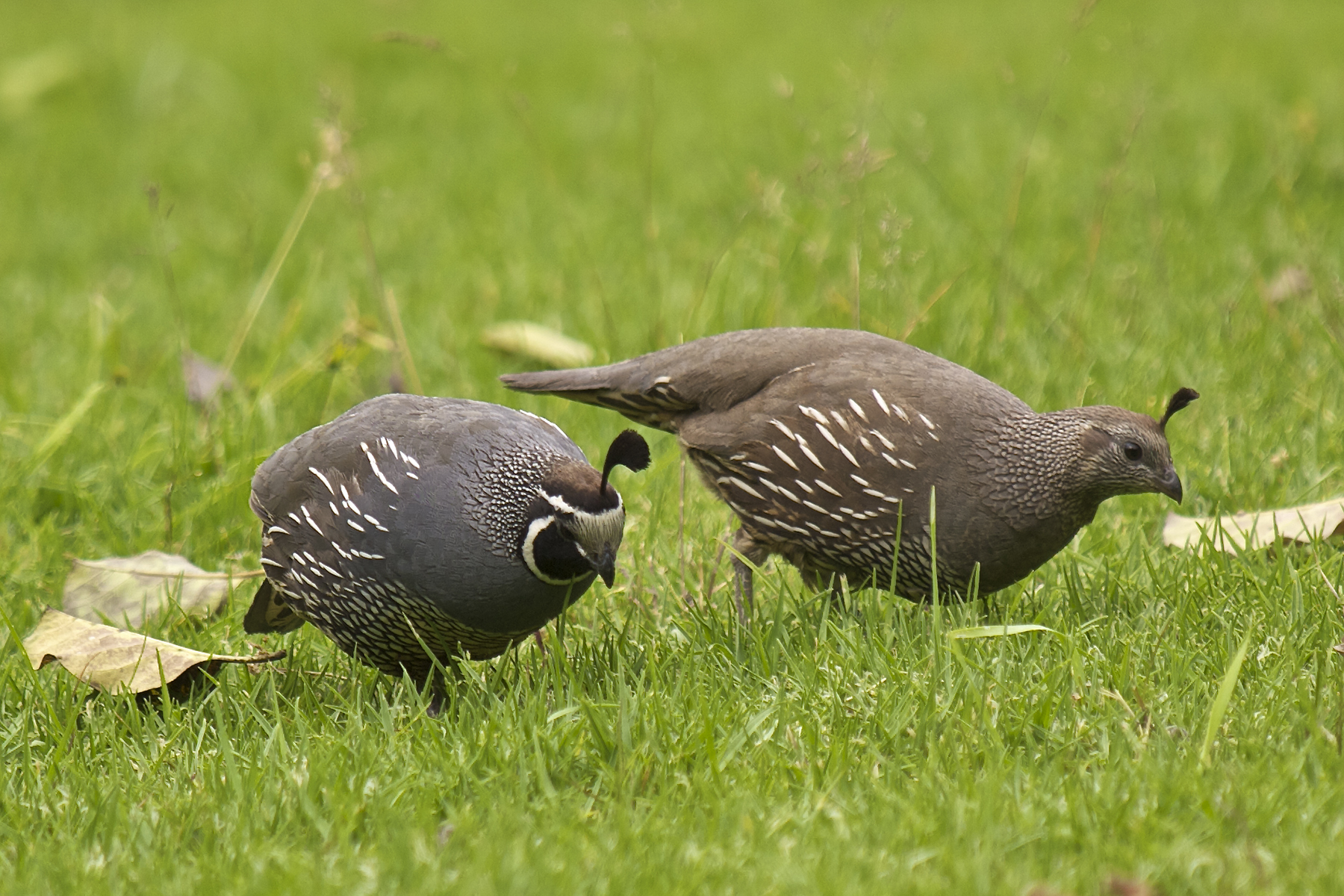
A pair introduced in New Zealand

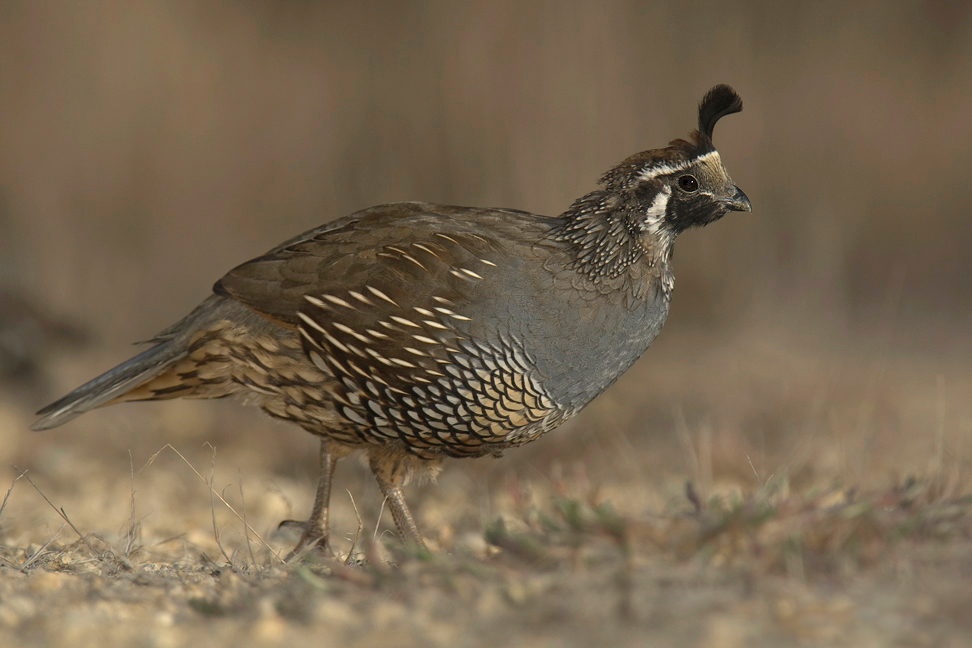
Male

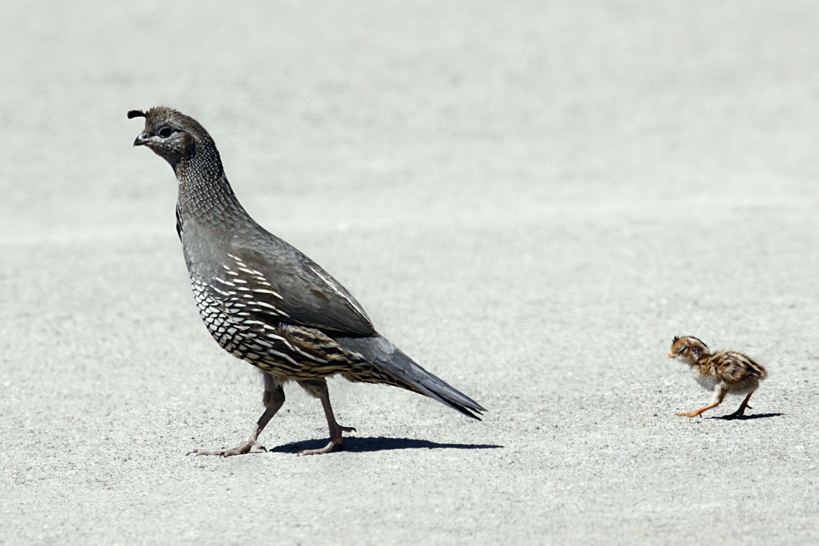
Female and young chick

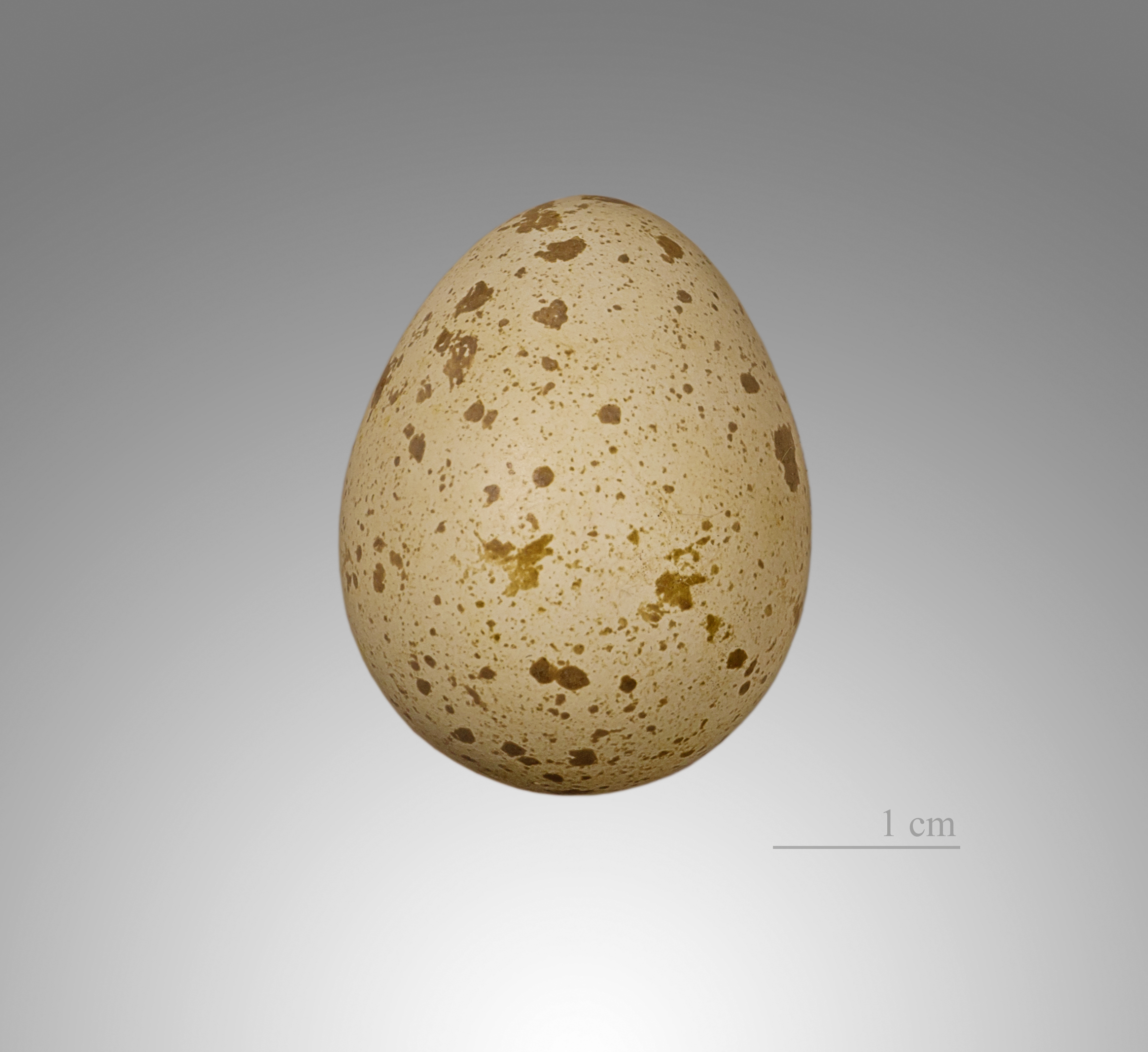
Egg – Muséum de Toulouse
