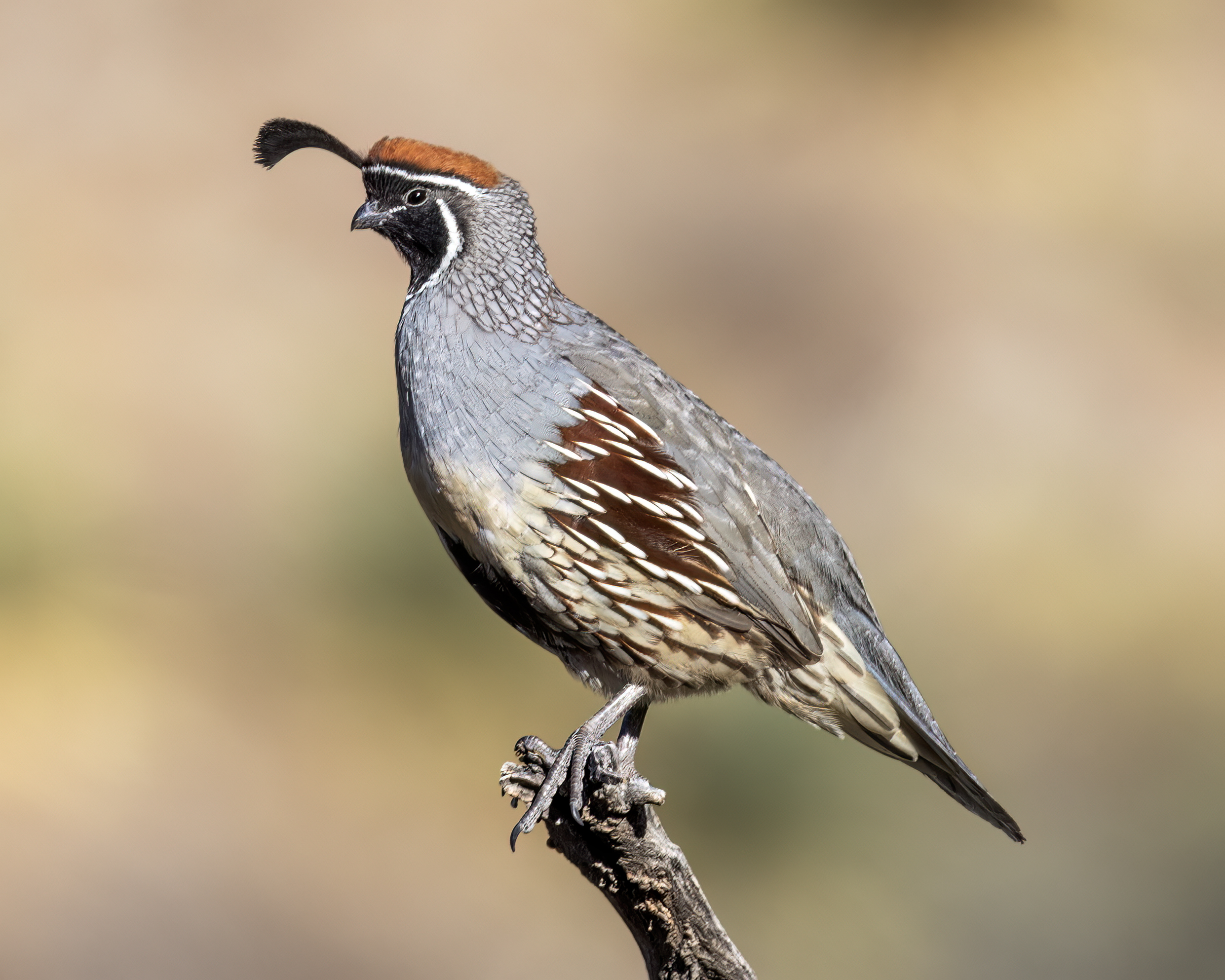
- Male in Rockhound State Park, New Mexico
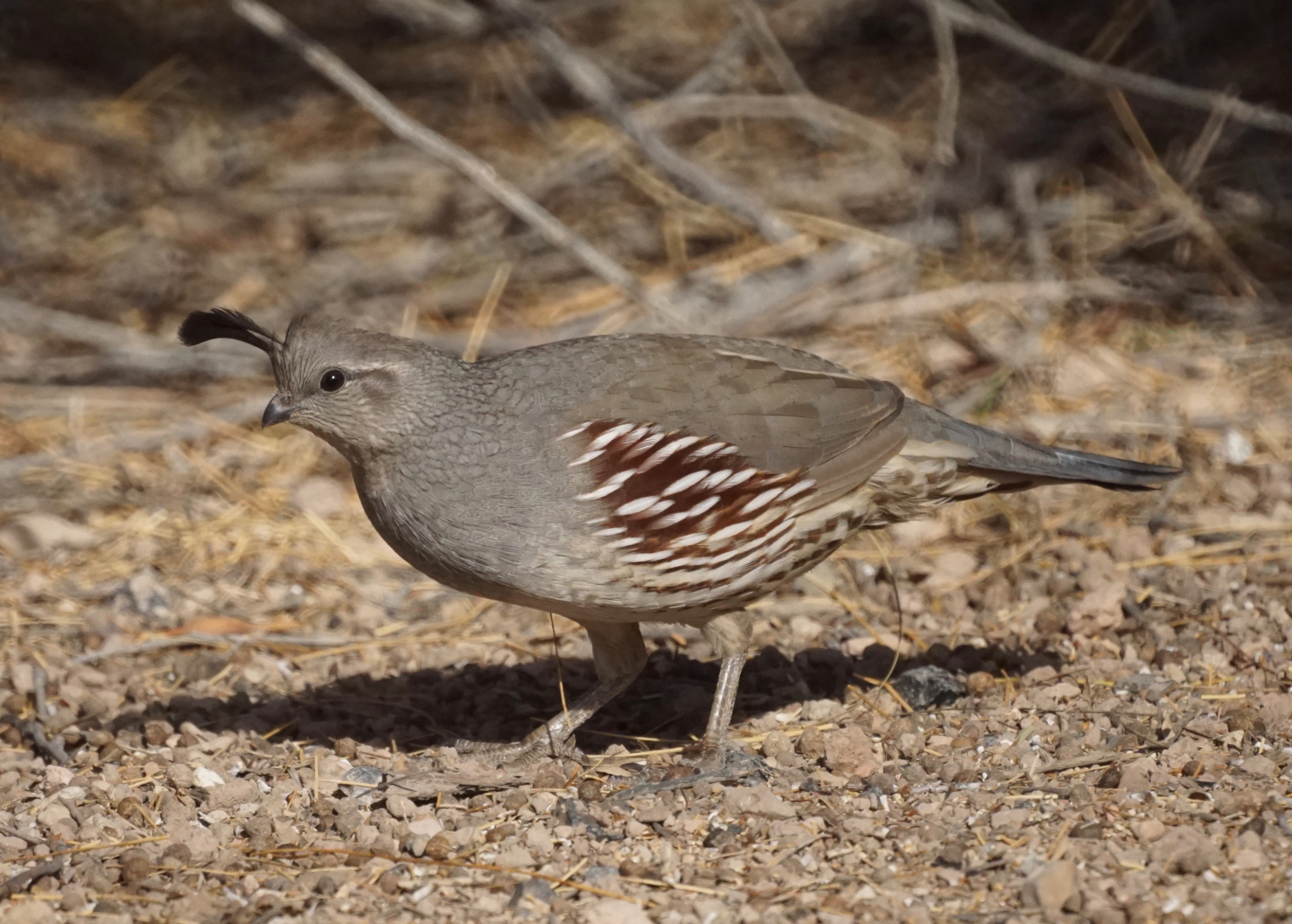
- Female

Conservation status
- Least Concern (IUCN 3.1)

- Secure (NatureServe)

Scientific classification
- Kingdom: Animalia
- Phylum: Chordata
- Class: Aves
- Order: Galliformes
- Family: Odontophoridae
- Genus: Callipepla
- Species: C. gambelii

Binomial name
- Callipepla gambelii (Gambel, 1843)

Synonyms
- Lophortyx gambelii Gambel, 1843

= Gambel's quail =

Species of bird

Gambel's quail (Callipepla gambelii) is a small ground-dwelling bird in the New World quail family. It inhabits the desert regions of Arizona, California, Colorado, New Mexico, Nevada, Utah, Texas, and Sonora; also New Mexico-border Chihuahua and the Colorado River region of Baja California. Gambel's quail is named in honor of William Gambel, a 19th-century naturalist and explorer of the Southwestern United States.

The species is not as widely introduced as the related California quail. It was, however, released on San Clemente Island in 1912 by Charles T. Howland et al., where it is currently still established.

== Description ==
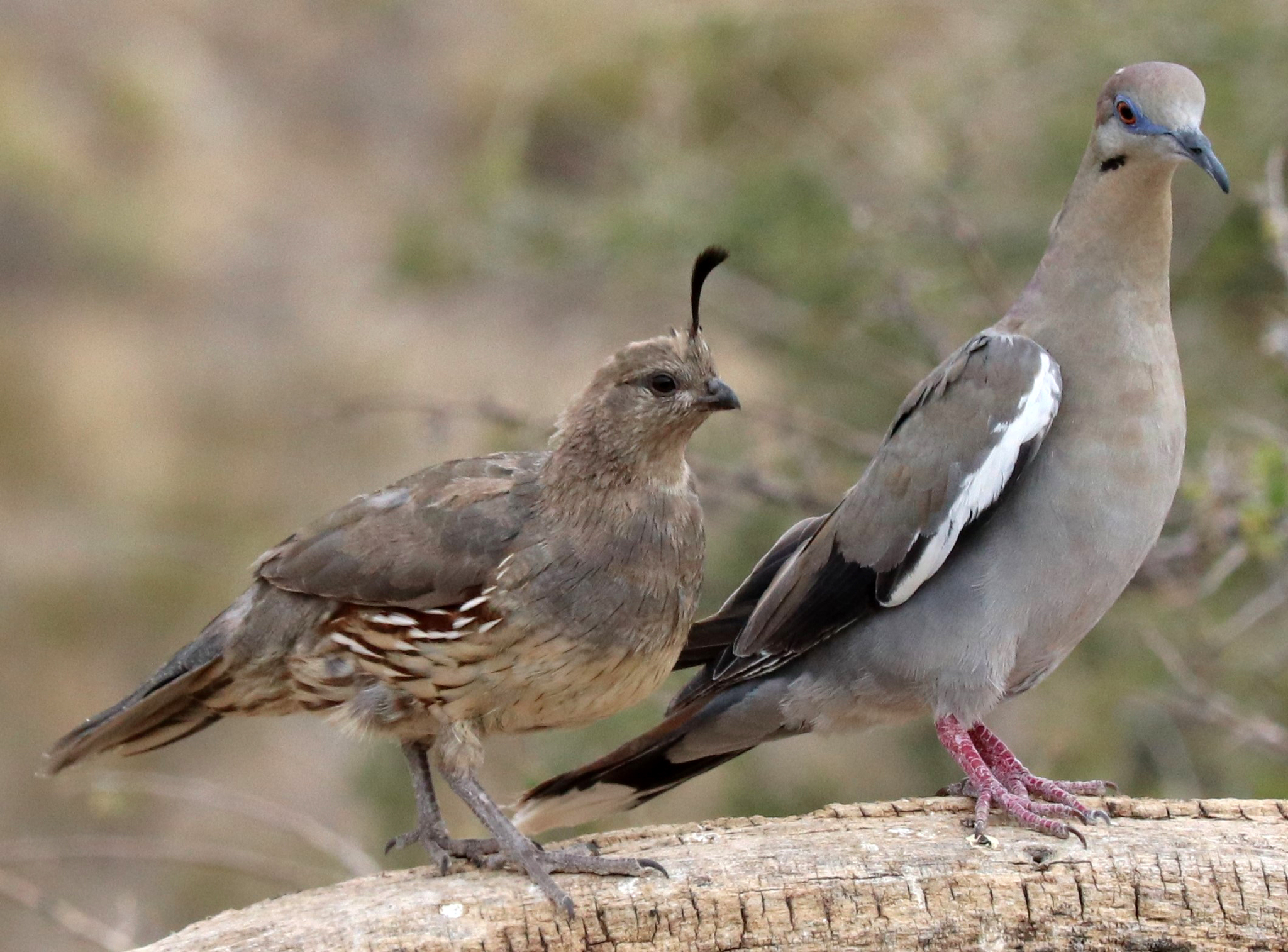
Female with a white-winged dove

The Callipepla gambelii birds are easily recognized by their top knots and scaly plumage on their undersides. Gambel's quail have bluish-gray plumage on much of their bodies, and males have copper feathers on the top of their heads, black faces, and white stripes above their eyes. Their average length is 11 in (28 cm) with a wingspan of 14–16 in (36–41 cm). These birds have relatively short, rounded wings and long, featherless legs. Their diet consists primarily of plant matter and seeds.

Gambel's quail can be commonly confused with California quail due to their similar plumage. They can usually be distinguished by range, but when this does not suffice, California quail have a more scaly appearance and the black patch on the lower breast of the male Gambel's quail is absent in the California quail. The two species are sister taxa which diverged during the Late Pliocene or Early Pleistocene, 1 to 2 million years ago.

== Taxonomy ==
=== Subspecies ===
There are two recognized subspecies:

- C. g. fulvipectus (Nelson, 1899) – fulvous-breasted quail – southeast Arizona and southwest New Mexico to southern Sonora in Mexico
- C. g. gambelii (Gambel, 1843) – nominate – Utah and Nevada through Mojave Desert to Colorado, northeastern Baja California and Tiburón Island.

== Behavior ==
Gambel's quail primarily move about by walking and can move surprisingly fast through brush and undergrowth. They are a non-migratory species and are rarely seen in flight. Any flight is usually short and explosive, with many rapid wingbeats, followed by a slow glide to the ground. In the late summer, fall, and winter, the adults and immature young congregate into coveys of many birds. In the spring, Gambel's quail pair off for mating and become very aggressive toward other pairs. The chicks are decidedly more insectivorous than adults, gradually consuming more plant matter as they mature. Gambel's quail are monogamous and rarely breed in colonies. The female typically lays 10–12 eggs in a simple scrape concealed in vegetation, often at the base of a rock or tree. Incubation lasts from 21–23 days, usually performed by the female and rarely by the male. The chicks are precocial, leaving the nest with their parents within hours of hatching.

== Gallery ==
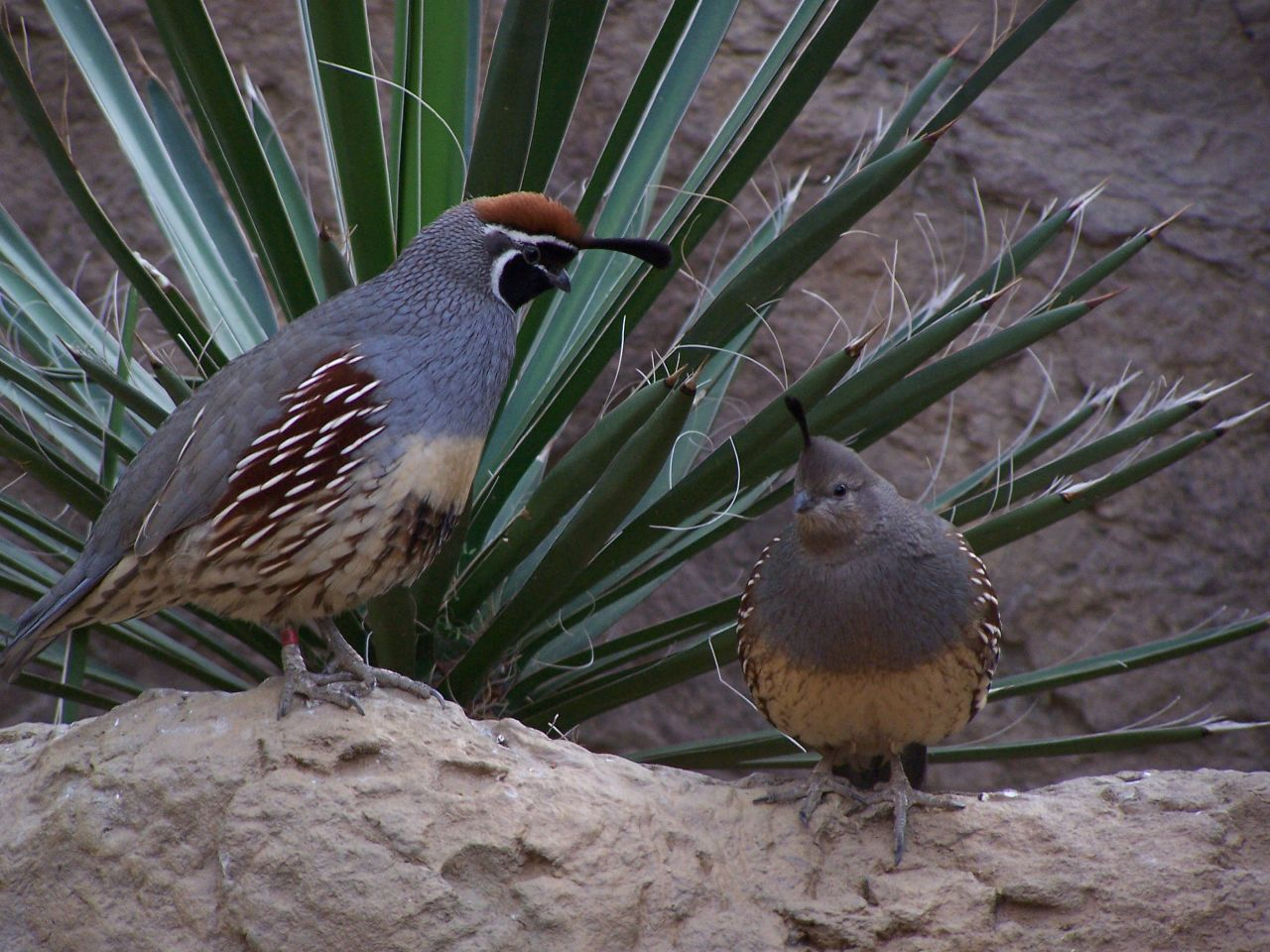
A pair at Indianapolis Zoo (male on left and female on right)

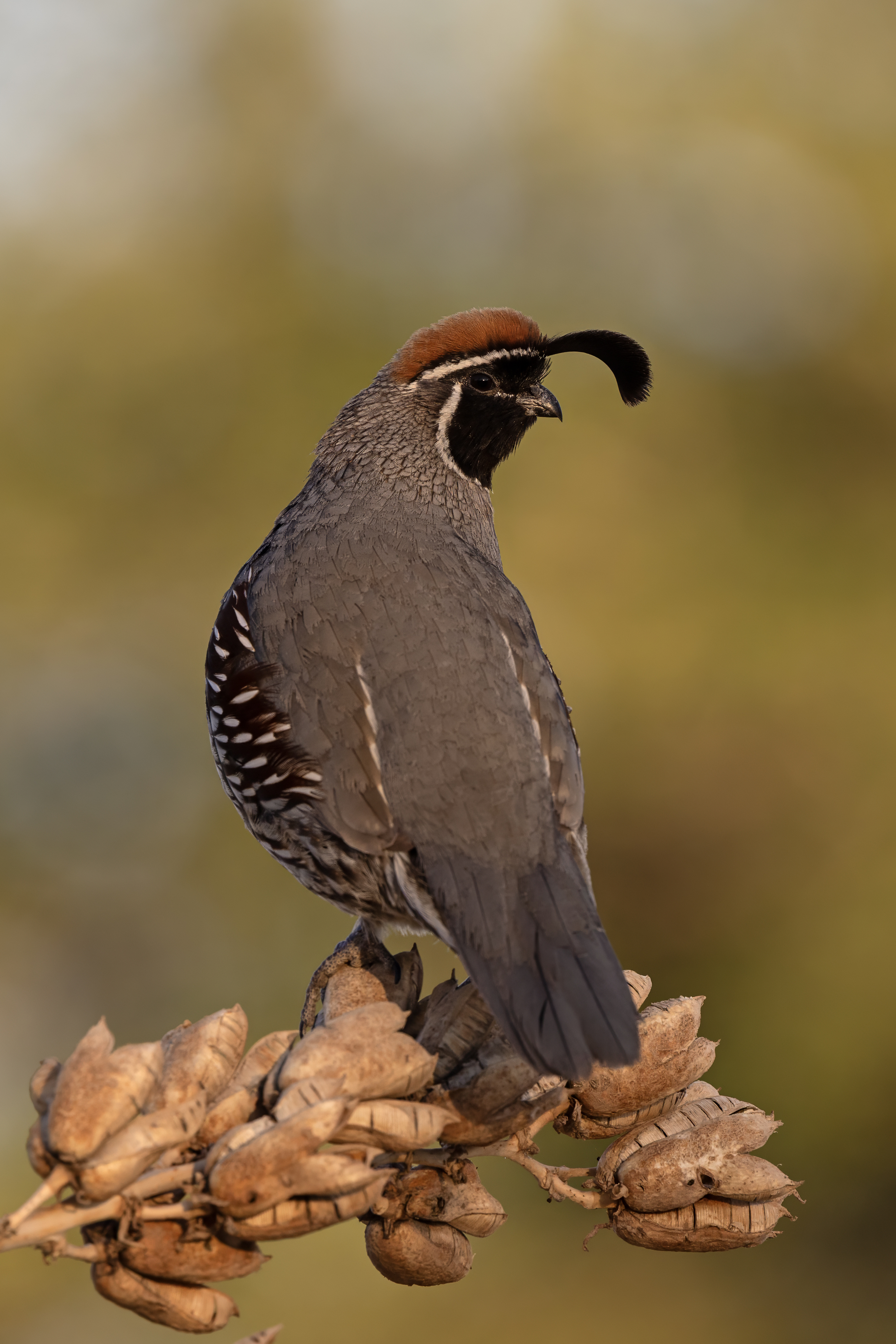
Male Gambel's quail in Las Cruces, New Mexico

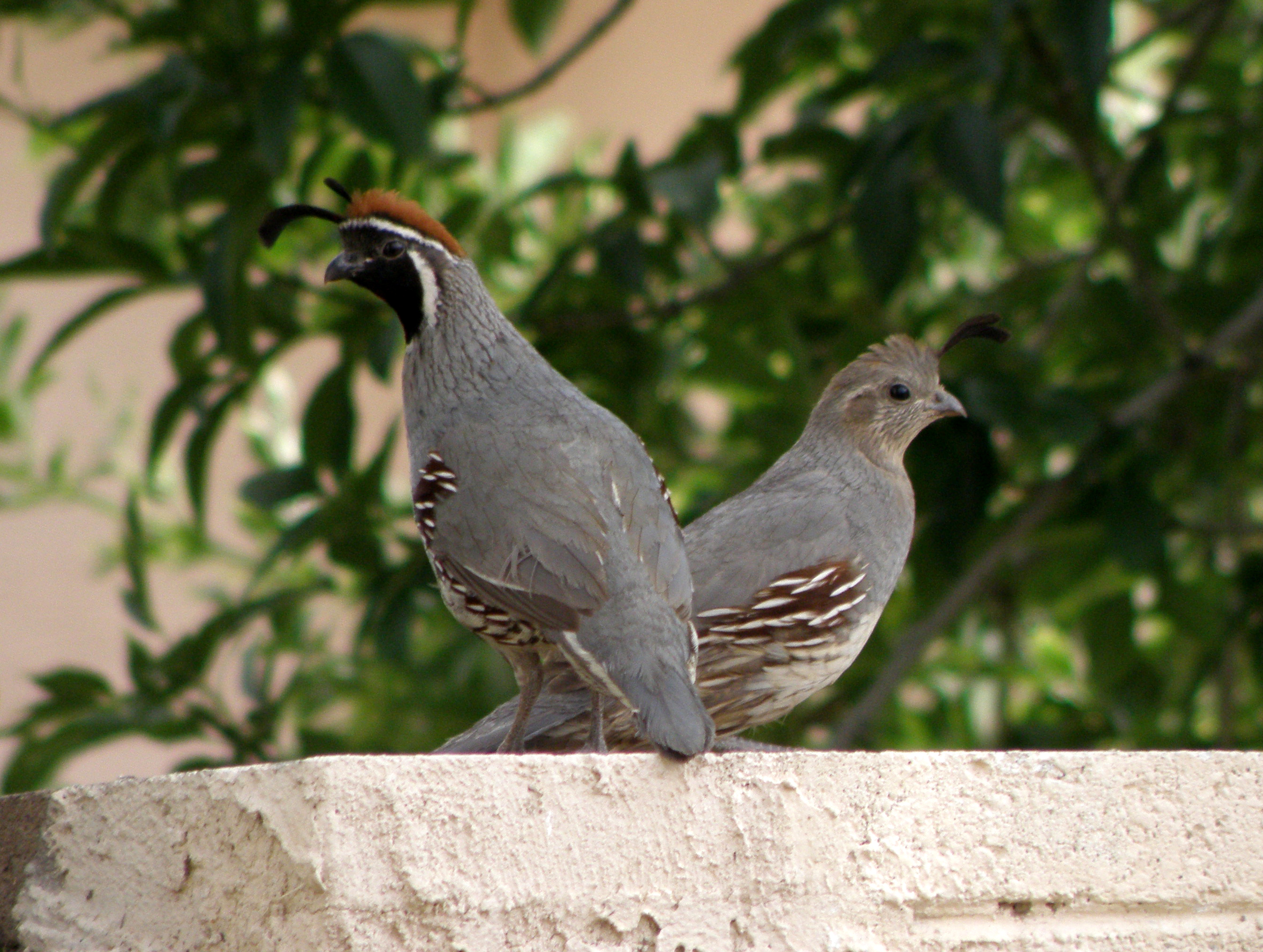
Male and female Gambel's quail in Mesa, Arizona

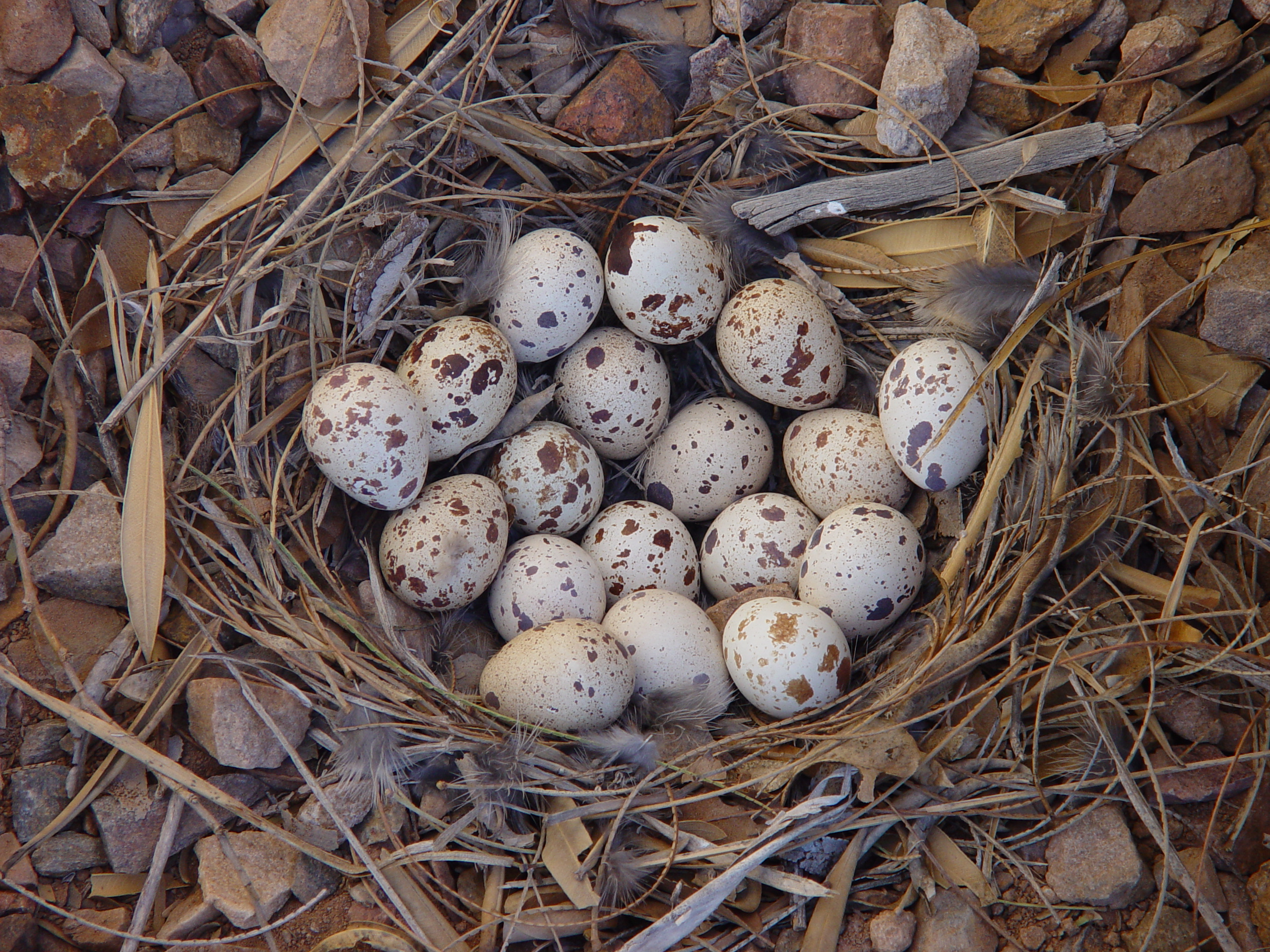
Gambel's Quail nest in San Tan Valley, Arizona

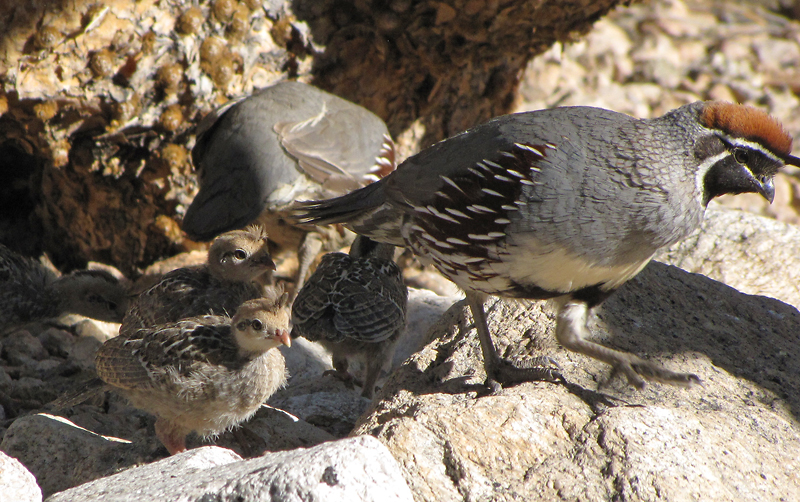
Adults with chicks

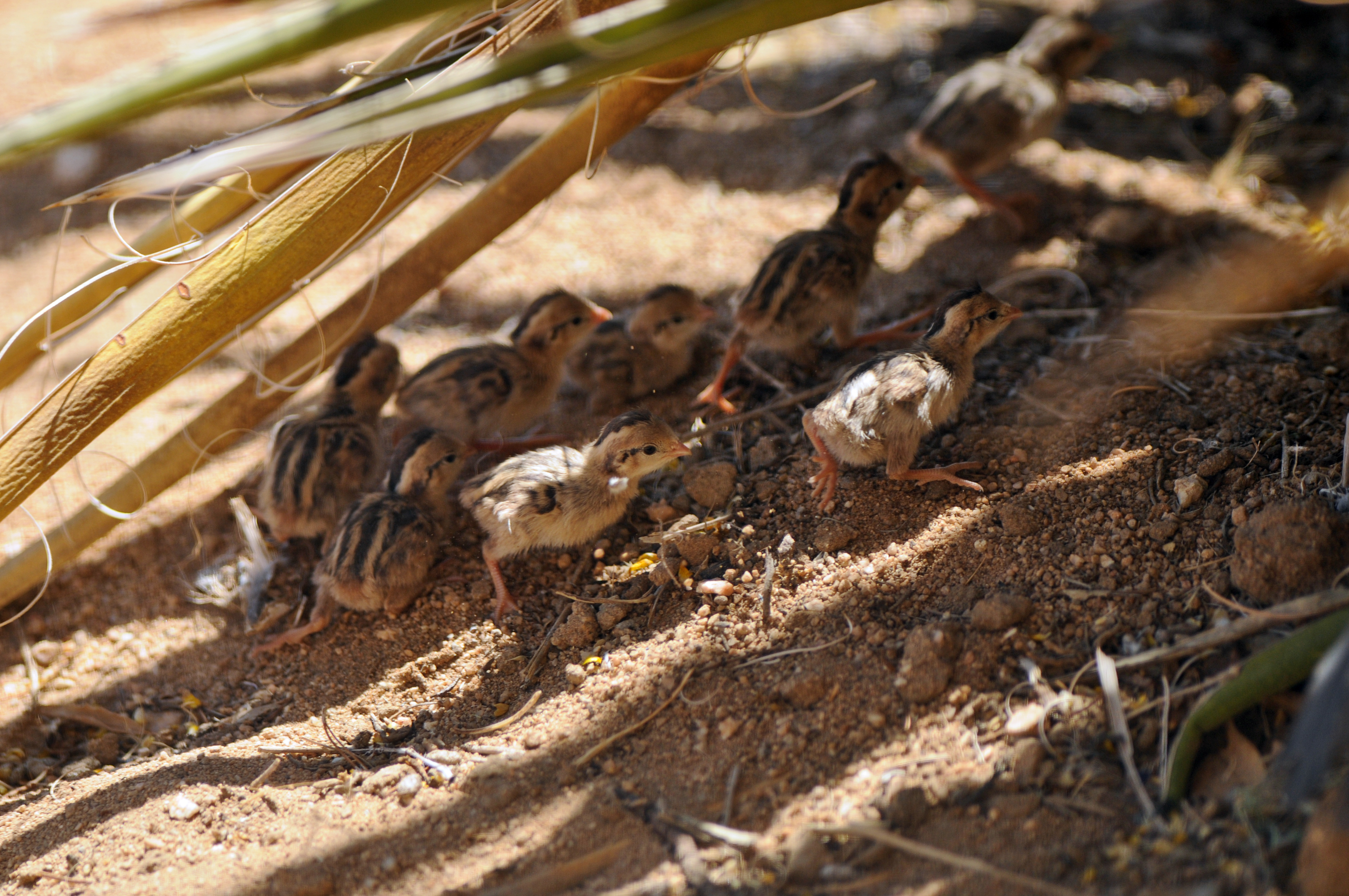
Gambel's quail chicks at Joshua Tree National Park

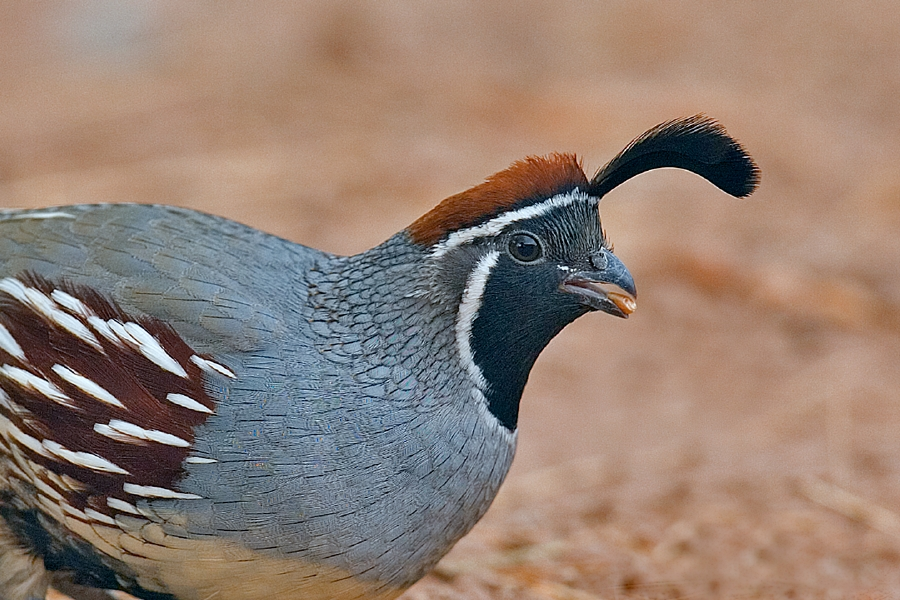
Male

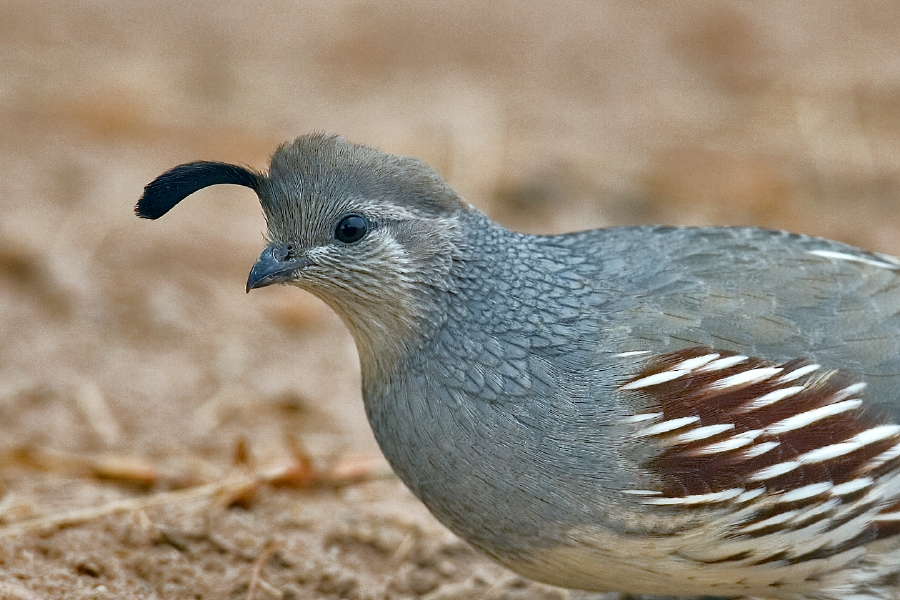
Female
