= Irrigation in viticulture =

Process of applying extra water in the cultivation of grapevines

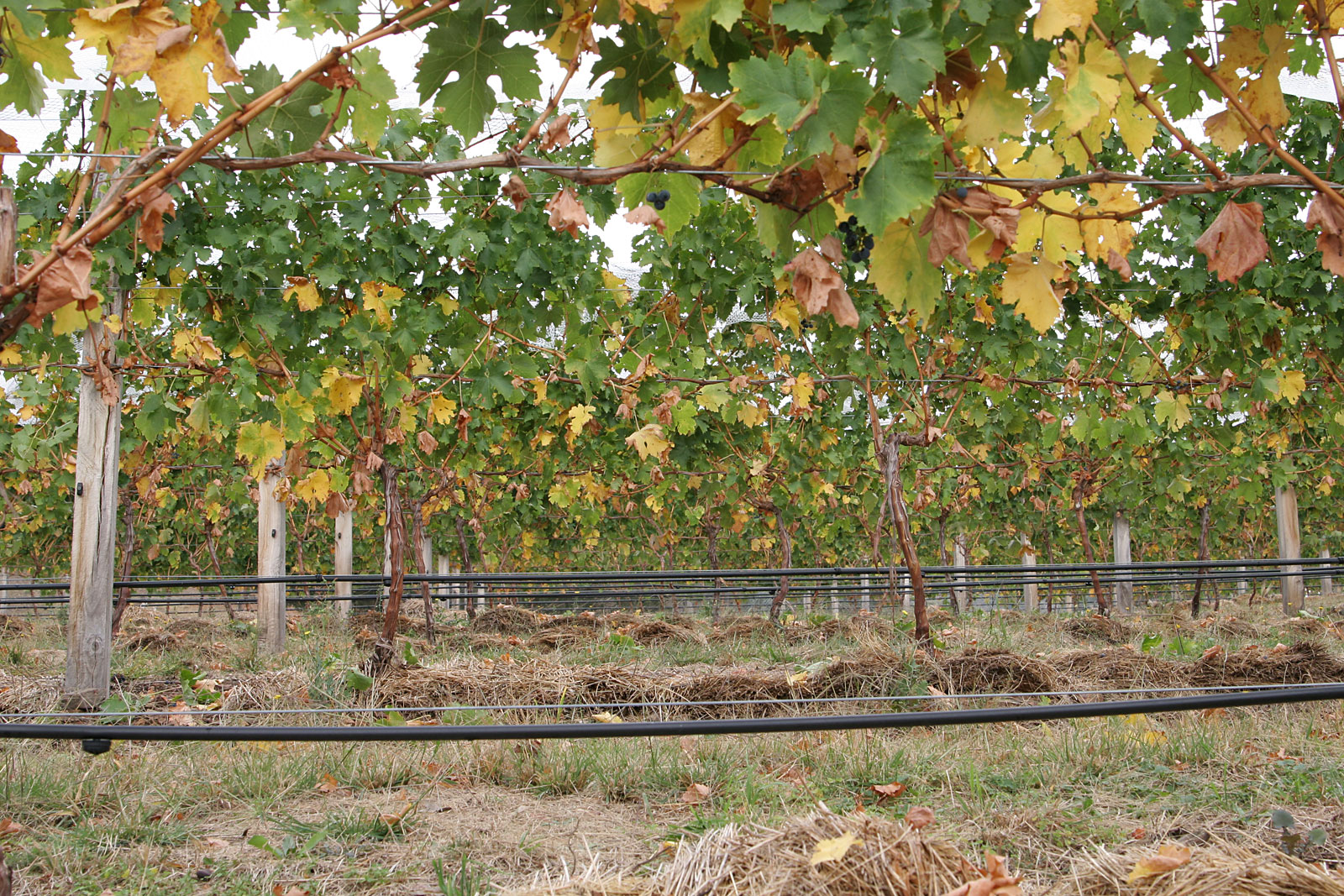
A vineyard with a drip irrigation system running along the bottom of the vines

Irrigation in viticulture is the process of applying extra water in the cultivation of grapevines. It is considered both controversial and essential to wine production. In the physiology of the grapevine, the amount of available water affects photosynthesis and hence growth, as well as the development of grape berries. While climate and humidity play important roles, a typical grape vine needs 25-35 inches (635-890 millimeters) of water a year, occurring during the spring and summer months of the growing season, to avoid stress. A vine that does not receive the necessary amount of water will have its growth altered in a number of ways; some effects of water stress (particularly, smaller berry size and somewhat higher sugar content) are considered desirable by wine grape growers.

In many Old World wine regions, natural rainfall is considered the only source for water that will still allow the vineyard to maintain its terroir characteristics. The practice of irrigation is viewed by some critics as unduly manipulative with the potential for detrimental wine quality due to high yields that can be artificially increased with irrigation. It has been historically banned by the European Union's wine laws, though in recent years individual countries (such as Spain) have been loosening their regulations and France's wine governing body, the Institut National des Appellations d'Origine (INAO), has also been reviewing the issue.

In very dry climates that receive little rainfall, irrigation is considered essential to any viticultural prospects. Many New World wine regions such as Australia and California regularly practice irrigation in areas that couldn't otherwise support viticulture. Advances and research in these wine regions (as well as some Old World wine regions such as Israel), have shown that potential wine quality could increase in areas where irrigation is kept to a minimum and managed. The main principle behind this is controlled water stress, where the vine receives sufficient water during the budding and flowering period, but irrigation is then scaled back during the ripening period so that the vine then responds by funneling more of its limited resources into developing the grape clusters instead of excess foliage. If the vine receives too much water stress, then photosynthesis and other important processes such as nutrient storage could be impacted with the vine essentially shutting down. The availability of irrigation means that if drought conditions emerge, sufficient water can be provided for the plant so that the balance between water stress and development is kept to optimal levels.

== History ==
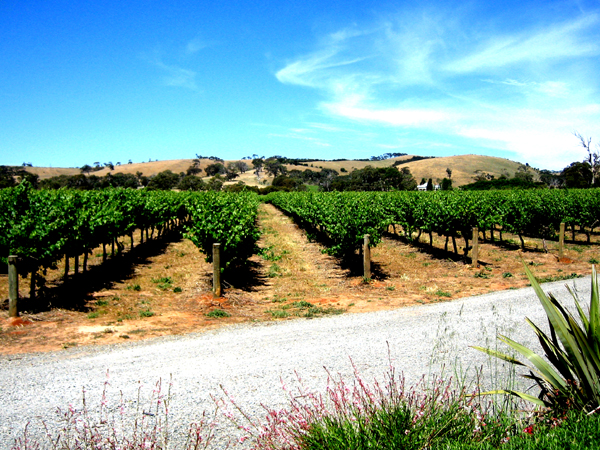
Advances in irrigation have allowed viticulture to flourish in very dry climates, such as parts of Australia, that might not otherwise be able to sustain grapevines.

The practice of irrigation has a long history in wine production. Archaeologists describe it as one of the oldest practices in viticulture, with irrigation canals discovered near vineyard sites in Armenia and Egypt dating back more than 2600 years. Irrigation was already widely practiced for other agricultural crops since around 5000 BC. It is possible that the knowledge of irrigation helped viticulture spread from these areas to other regions, due to the potential for the grapevine to grow in soils too infertile to support other food crops. A somewhat robust plant, the grapevine's largest need is for sufficient sunshine, and it is able to flourish with minimum needs of water and nutrients. In areas where its water needs are unfulfilled, the availability of irrigation meant that viticulture could still be supported.

In the 20th century, the expanding wine industries of California, Australia and Israel were greatly enhanced by advances in irrigation. With the development of more cost efficient and less labor-intensive ways of watering the vines, vast tracts of very sunny but dry lands were able to be converted into wine-growing regions. The ability to control the precise amount of water each vine received, allowed producers in these New World wine regions to develop styles of wines that could be fairly consistent each year regardless of normal vintage variation. This created a stark contrast to the Old World wine regions of Europe where vintage variation, including rainfall, had a pronounced effect on the potential wine style each year. Continuing research explored the way that controlled (or supplemental) irrigation could be used to increase potential wine quality by influencing how the grapevine responds to its environment and funnels resources into developing the sugars, acids and phenolic compounds that contribute to a wine's quality. This research lead to the development of ways to measure the amount of water retention in the soil, so that individual irrigation regimes could be plotted for each vineyard that maximized the benefits of water management.

== Role of water in viticulture ==
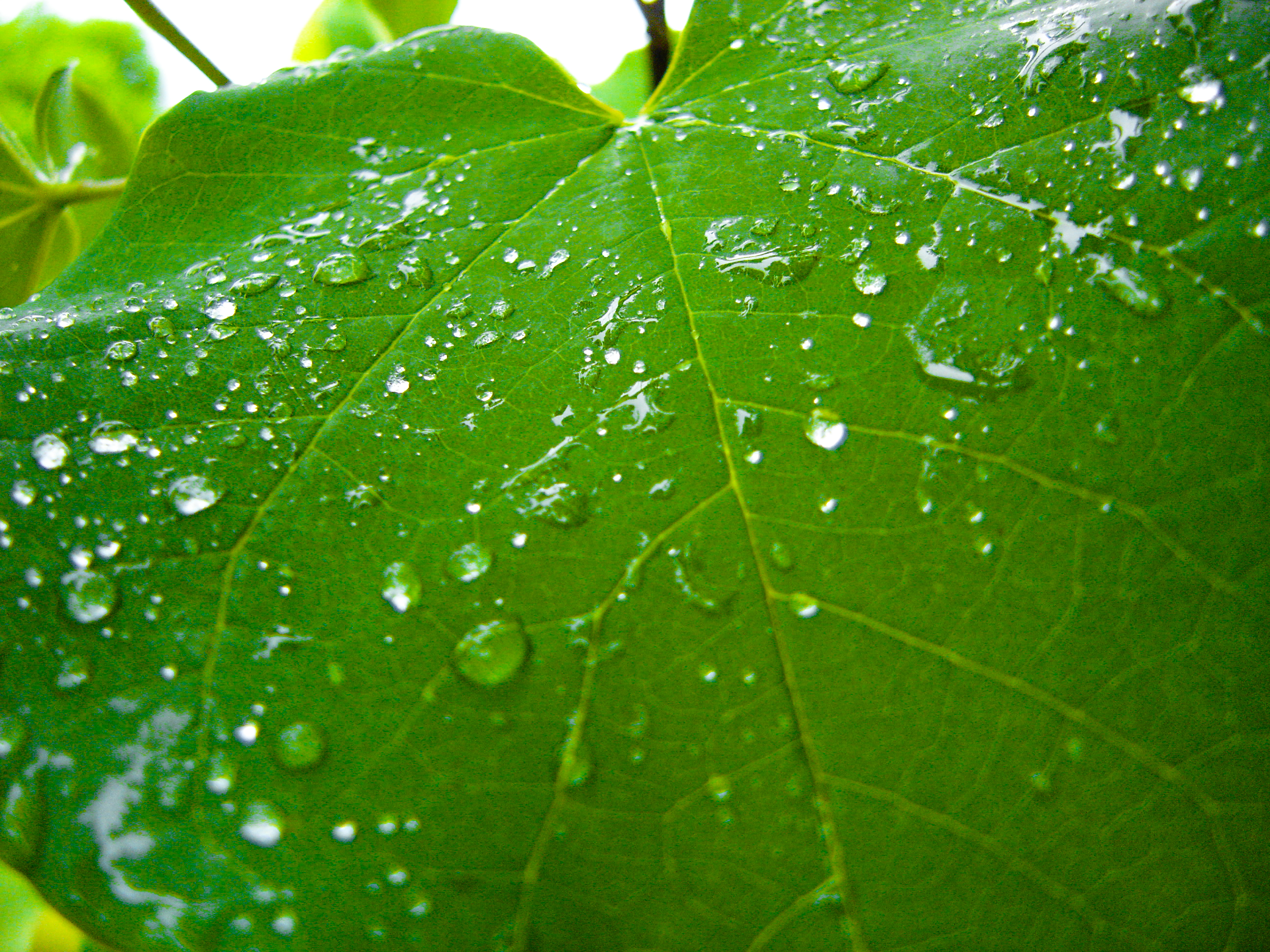
Water is vital to many of the physiological processes of the grape vine, including photosynthesis.

The presence of water is essential for the survival of all plant life. In a grapevine, water acts as a universal solvent for many of the nutrients and minerals needed to carry out important physiological functions, and the vine receives these by absorbing the nutrient-containing water from the soil. In the absence of sufficient water in the soil, the root system of the vine may have difficulties absorbing these nutrients. Within the structure of the plant itself, water acts as a transport within the xylem to bring these nutrients to all ends of the plant. During the process of photosynthesis, water molecules combine with carbon derived from carbon dioxide to form glucose, which is the primary energy source of the vine, as well as oxygen as a by-product.

In addition to its use in photosynthesis, a vine's water supply is also depleted by the processes of evaporation and transpiration. In evaporation, heat (aided by wind and sunlight) causes water in the soil to evaporate and escape as vapor molecules. This process is inversely related to humidity with evaporation taking place at faster rates in areas with low relative humidity. In transpiration, this evaporation of water occurs directly in the vine, as water is released from the plant through the stomata that are located on the undersides of the leaves. This loss of water from the leaves is one of the driving factors that results in water being drawn up from the roots, and it also helps the vine combat against the effects of heat stress which can severely damage the physiological functions of the vine (somewhat similar to how perspiration works with humans and animals). The presence of adequate water in the vines can help keep the internal temperature of the leaf only a few degrees above the temperature of the surrounding air. However, if water is severely lacking then that internal temperature could jump nearly 18 °F (10 °C) warmer than the surrounding air which leads the vine to develop heat stress. The dual effects of evaporation and transpiration are called evapotranspiration. A typical vineyard in a hot, dry climate can lose as much as 1,700 U.S. gallons (6,400 L; 1,400 imp gal) of water per vine through evapotranspiration during the growing season.

== Factors influencing irrigation ==
Climates with low humidity promote faster rates evapotranspiration which reduce the grapevine's water supply. These areas may need to utilize supplemental irrigation.

There are essentially two main types of irrigation; primary irrigation, which is needed for areas (such as very dry climates) that lack sufficient rainfall for viticulture to even exist, and supplemental irrigation where irrigation is used to "fill in the gaps" of natural rainfall to bring water levels to better numbers as well as to serve as a preventive measure in case of seasonal drought conditions. In both cases, both the climate and the vineyard soils of the region will play an instrumental role in irrigation's use and effectiveness.

=== Impact of different climate types ===
Viticulture is most commonly found in Mediterranean, continental and maritime climates with each unique climate providing its own challenges in providing sufficient water at critical times during the growing season. In Mediterranean climates irrigation is usually needed during the very dry periods of the summer ripening stages where drought can be a persistent threat. The level of humidity in a particular macroclimate will dictate exactly how much irrigation is needed with high levels of evapotranspiration more commonly occurring in Mediterranean climates that have low levels of humidity such as part of Chile and the Cape Province of South Africa. In these low humidity regions, primary irrigation may be needed, but in many Mediterranean climates the irrigation is usually supplemental. The amount of precipitation that occurs during spring and summer months is also important. For example, Tuscany receives an average of 8 inches (200 mm) of rainfall during the months of April through June - the period that includes flowering and fruit set, when the water is most crucial. While fluctuations in rainfall do occur, the amount of natural precipitation, combined with water holding capacity of soil, is typically sufficient to result in healthy harvest. In contrast, Napa Valley only gets 2.4 inches (60 mm), on average, during the same period of time, often in an erratic pattern (some years seeing more, some years seeing only trace amounts of rain), and most appellations in Central and Southern California (both along the coast and inland) receive even less than that, necessitating supplemental irrigation.

Continental climates are usually seen in areas further inland from the coastal influences of oceans and large bodies of water. The difference from the average mean temperature of its coldest and hottest months can be quite significant with moderate precipitation that usually occurs in the winter and early spring. Depending on the water retaining ability of the soil the grapevine may receive enough water during this period to last throughout the growing season with little if any irrigation needed. For soils with poor water retention, the dry summer months may require some supplemental irrigation. Examples of continental climates that use supplemental irrigation include the Columbia Valley of Washington State and the Mendoza wine region of Argentina.

Maritime climates tend to fall between Mediterranean and continental climates with a moderate climate that is tempered by the effects of a large body of water nearby. As with Mediterranean climates, the humidity of the particular macroclimate will play a significant role in determining how much irrigation is needed. In most cases irrigation, if it is used at all, will only be supplemental in years where drought may be an issue. Many maritime regions, such as Rias Baixas in Galicia, Bordeaux and the Willamette Valley in Oregon, suffer from the diametric problem of having too much rain during the growing season.

=== Impact of different soil types ===
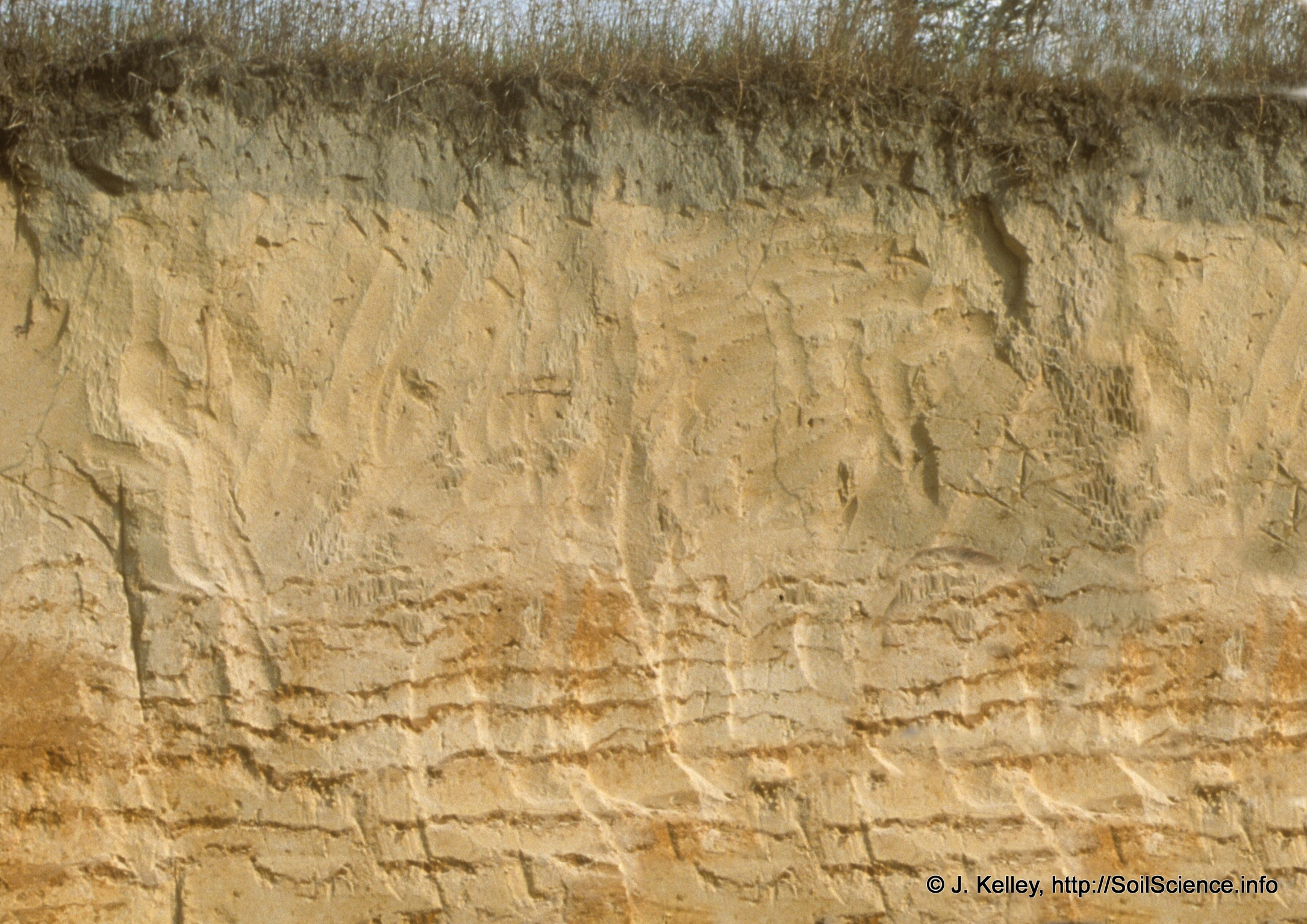
Sandy soils typically have poor water retention but good drainage. However, if its mixed with significant amounts of clay, such as this soil sample, its water retaining properties will increase while still draining well.

Soil can have a significant impact on the potential quality of wine. While geologist and viticulturist are not exactly sure what type of immutable or terroir based qualities that soil can impart on wine, there is near universal agreement that a soil's water retention and drainage abilities play a primary role. Water retention refers to the soil's ability to hold water. The term "field capacity" is used to describe the maximum amount of water that deeply moistened soil will retain after normal drainage. Drainage is the ability of water to move freely throughout the soil. The ideal circumstance is soil that can retain sufficient amount of water for the grapevine but drains well enough to where the soil doesn't become water-logged. Soil that doesn't retain water well encourages the vine to easily sleep into water stress while soil that doesn't drain well runs of the risk of water-logged roots being attacked by microbial agents that consume all the soil nutrients and end up starving the vine.

The depth, texture and composition of soils can influence its water retaining and draining ability. Soils containing large amounts of organic material tend to have the highest water retention abilities. These types of soils include deep loams, silty soils like what is typically found on the fertile valley floors such as in the California's Napa Valley. Clay particles have the potential to remain in colloidal suspension for long periods of time when it is dissolved in water. This gives clay-based soils the potential to retain significant amount of water such as the clay soils of the Right bank Bordeaux region of Pomerol. Many regions with these types of water retaining soils have little need for irrigation, or if they do it is usually supplemental during periods of drought. Soils with poor water retention include sand and alluvial gravel based soils such as those found in the Barolo and Barbaresco zones of Italy or in many areas of South Australia. Depending on the climate and amount of natural rainfall, areas with poor water retention may need irrigation.

Just as having too little water is detrimental to the grapevine, so too is having too much. When vines become water-logged they become a target for various microbial agents such as bacteria and fungi that compete with the vine for nutrients in the soil. Additionally excessively moist soil is poor conductor of valuable heat radiating from the ground. In general wet soils are cold soils which can be especially problematic during the flowering causing poor berry set that could lead to coulure. It also becomes an issue during the ripening stage when vines in cool-climate regions may need additional heat radiated from the ground in order to sufficiently ripen its fruit (an example of this is the slate-based vineyards of the Mosel in Germany). Therefore, well draining soils are considered very conducive to producing quality wine. In general light-textured (such as sand and gravel) and stony soils tend to drain well. Soils heavy soils and those with high proportions of organic matter also have the potential to drain well if they having a crumbling texture and structure. This texture relates to the friability of the soil which can come from earthworms and other organisms that have burrowed tunnels throughout the soil. Much like rocks, these tunnels give water a freer passageway through soil and contributes to its drainage.

=== Measuring soil moisture ===
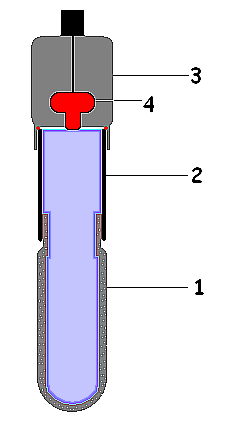
Tensiometers can be used to measure soil moisture. The components of this example include (1) porous cup, (2) water-filled tube (3) sensor-head and a (4) pressure sensor.

Because of the problems associated with water-logged and wet soils, it is important for viticulturist to know how much water is currently in the soil before deciding if and how much to irrigate. Nowadays, precision agriculture uses high technology in the field, providing the producers with accurate measurements of the water needs of any specific vine. There are several methods of evaluating soil moisture. The most basic is simple observation and feeling of the soil, however this has its limitations since the subsoil may be moist while the surface soil appears dry. More specific measurements can be attained by using tensiometers which evaluates surface tension of water extracted from the soil. The presence of water in the soil can be measured by neutron moisture meters that utilize an aluminium tube with an internal neutron source that detect the subtle change between the water in the soil. Similarly, gypsum block placed throughout the vineyard contain an electrode that can be used to detect the electrical resistance that occurs as the soil dries and water is released by evaporation. Since the 1990s there has been greater research into tools utilizing time-domain reflectometry and capacitance probes. In addition to monitoring for excessive moisture, viticulturists also keep an eye for signs of water stress (discussed below) due to severe lack of water.

== Irrigation systems ==
There are several methods of irrigation that can be used in viticulture depending on the amount of control and water management desired. Historically, surface irrigation was the most common means using the gravity of a slope to release a flood of water across the vineyard. In the early history of the Chilean wine industry, flood irrigation was widely practiced in the vineyards using melted snow from the Andes Mountains channeled down to the valleys below. This method provided very little control and often had the adverse effect of over-watering the vine. An adaption of method was the furrow irrigation system used in Argentina where small channels ran through the vineyard providing irrigation. This provide slightly more control since the initial amount of water entering the channels could be regulated, however the amount that each vine received was sporadic.

Sprinkler irrigation involves the installation of a series of sprinkler units throughout the vineyard, often spaced as several rows about 65 feet (20 m) apart. The sprinklers can be set on an electronic timer and release predetermined amount of water for a set period of time. While this provides more control and uses less water than flood irrigation, like furrow irrigation the amount that each individual wine receives can be sporadic. The irrigation system that provides the most control over water management, though conversely the most expensive to install, is drip irrigation. This system involved long plastic water supply lines that run down each row of vines in the vineyard with each individual grape vine having its own individual dripper. With this system, a viticulturist can control the precise amount of water that each grapevine gets down to the drop. An adaption of this system, potentially useful in areas where irrigation may be banned, is underground subirrigation where precise measurements of water is delivered directly to the root system.

== Scheduling ==
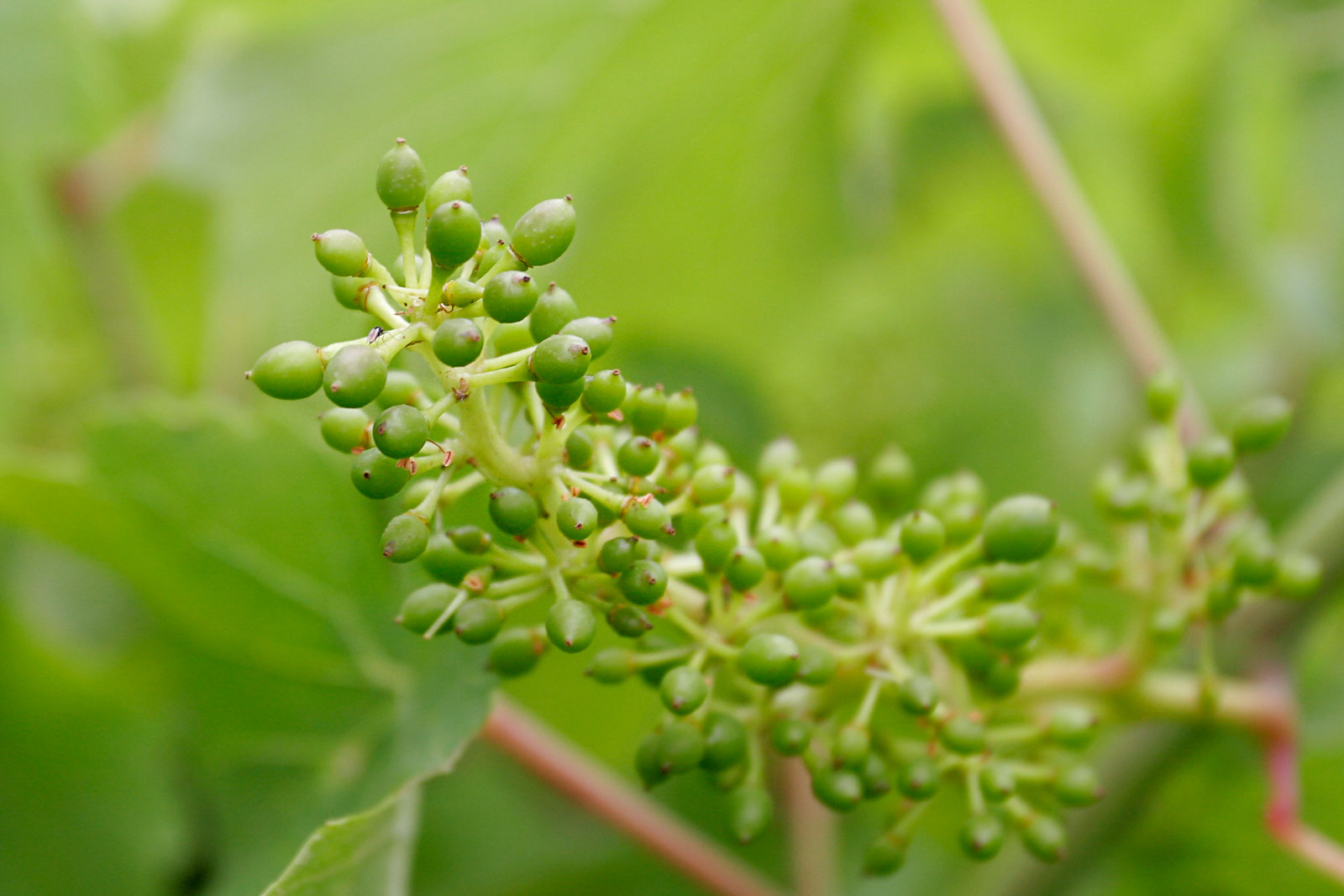
Water is very crucial during the early budding and flowering stages but after fruit set (pictured), the amount of water given to the vine may be scaled back in order to promote water stress.

With abundant water, a grapevine will produce shallow root systems and vigorous growths of new plant shoots. This can contribute to a large, leafy canopy and high yields of large grape berry clusters that may not be sufficiently or physiologically ripe. With insufficient water, many of the vine's important physiological structures, including photosynthesis that contributes to the development of sugars and phenolic compounds in the grape, can shut down. The key to irrigation is to provide just enough water for the plant to continuing function without encouraging vigorous growth of new shoots and shallow roots. The exact amount of water will depend on a variety of factors including how much natural rainfall can be expected as well as the water retaining and drainage properties of the soil.

Water is very crucial during the early budding and flowering stages of the growing season. In areas where there is not sufficient rainfall, irrigation may be needed during this time in the spring. After fruit set, the water needs for the vine drop and irrigation is often withheld till the period of veraison when the grapes begin to change color. This period of "water stress" encourages the vine to concentrate its limited resources into lower yields of smaller berries creating a favorable skin to juice ratio that is often desirable in quality wine production. The benefits or disadvantages of irrigation during the ripening period itself is a matter of debate and continuing research in the wine growing community. The only area of mostly agreement is the disadvantages of water close to harvest after a prolonged dry period. Grapevines that have been subjected to prolonged water stress have a tendency to rapidly absorb large amounts of water if its provided. This will dramatically swell the berries, potentially causing to them crack or burst which will make the prone to various grape diseases. Even if the berries do not crack or burst, the rapid swelling of water will cause a reduce concentration in sugars and phenolic compounds in the grape producing wines with diluted flavors and aromas.

=== Water stress ===
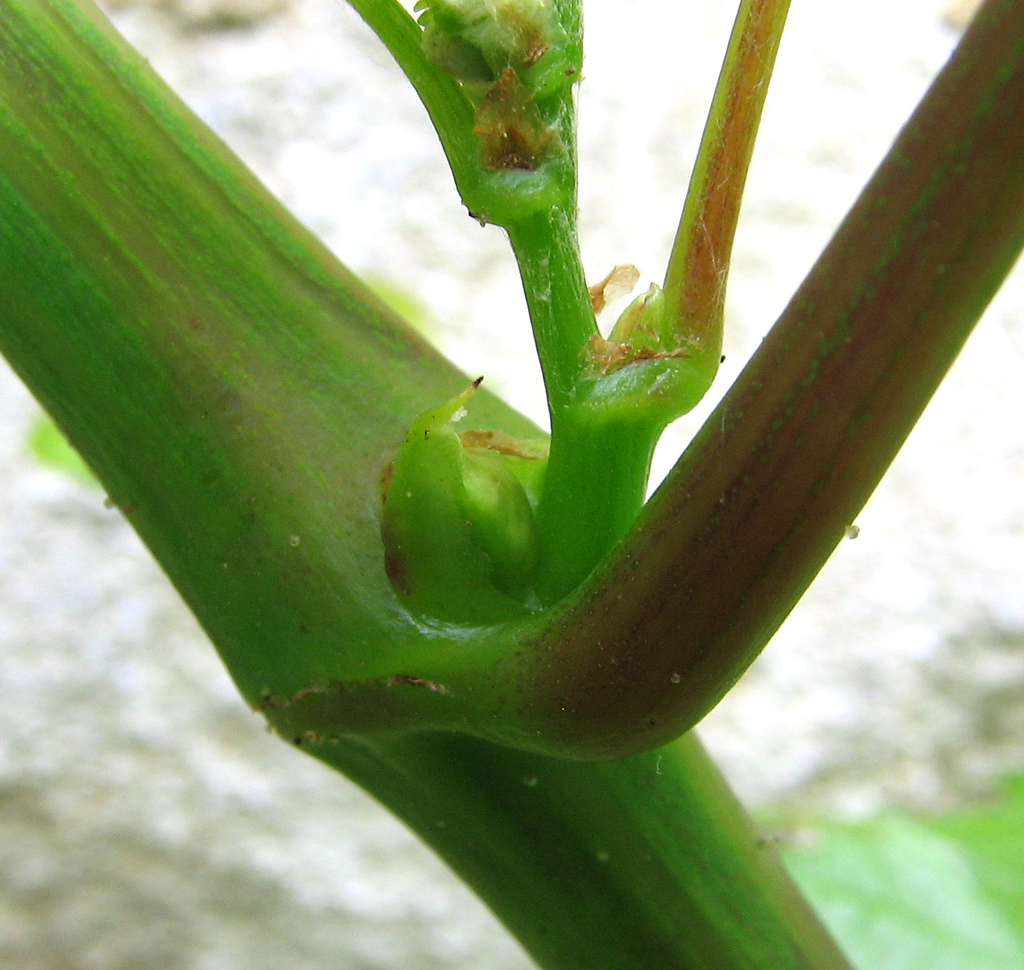
One of the goals of controlled, mild water stress is to discourage the formation of excess new plant growths (a bud pictured) which will compete with the developing grape clusters for the vine's limited resources.

The term water stress describes the physiological states that grapevines experience when they are deprived of water. When a grapevine goes into water stress one of its first functions is to reduce the growth of new plant shoots which compete with the grape clusters for nutrients and resources. The lack of water also keeps the individual grape berries down to a smaller size which increase its skin to juice ratio. As the skin is filled with color phenols, tannin and aroma compounds, the increase in skin-to-juice ratio is desirable for the potential added complexity the wine may have. While there is disagreement over exactly how much water stress is beneficial in development grapes for quality wine production, most viticulturist agree that some water stress can be beneficial. The grapevines in many Mediterranean climates such as Tuscany in Italy and the Rhone Valley in France experience natural water stress due to the reduced rainfall that occurs during the summer growing season.

At the far extreme is severe water stress which can have detrimental effects on both the vine and on potential wine quality. To conserve water, a vine will try to conserve water by limiting its loss through transpiration. The plant hormone abscisic acid triggers the stomata on the underside of the plant leaf to stay close in order to reduce the amount of water that is evaporated. While conserving water this also has the consequences of limiting the intake of carbon dioxide needed to sustain photosynthesis. If the vine is continually stressed it will keeps it stomata closed for longer and longer periods of time which can eventually cause photosynthesis to stop all together. When a vine has been so deprived of water it can exceed what is known as its permanent wilting point. At this point, the vine can become permanently damaged beyond recovery even if later watered. Viticulturists will carefully watch the plant for signs of severe water stress. Some of the symptoms include:

- Flaccid and wilting tendrils
- (During Flowering) Flower clusters that are dried out
- Wilting of young grape leaves followed by maturer leaves
- Chlorosis signaling that photosynthesis has stopped
- Necrosis of dying leaf tissue which leads to premature leaf fall
- Finally, the grape berries themselves start to shrivel and fall off the vine

The effectiveness of water stress is an area of continuing research in viticulture. Of particular focus is the connection between yield size and the potential benefits of water stress. Since the act of stressing the vine does contribute to reduce photosynthesis-and by extension, reduce ripening since the sugars produced by photosynthesis is needed for grape development-it is possible that a stressed vine with high yields will only produce many under ripe grapes. Another interest of study is the potential impact on white grape varieties with enologists and viticulturists such as Cornelius Van Leeuwen and Catherine Peyrot Des Gachons contending that white grape varieties lose some of their aromatic qualities when subjugated to even mild forms of water stress.

=== Partial rootzone drying ===
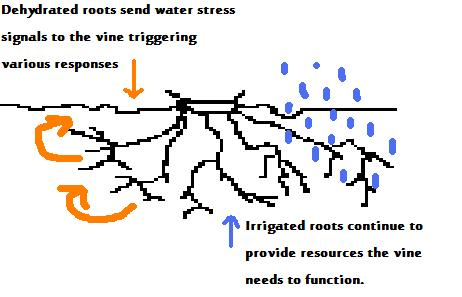
In partial rootzone drying, half the roots are allowed to dehydrate which sends signals to the vine that is experiencing "water stress". Meanwhile, the irrigated roots on the other side of vine continue to provide sufficient amounts of water so that vital functions like photosynthesis does not cease.

One irrigation technique known as partial rootzone drying (or PRD) involves "tricking" the grapevine into thinking it is undergoing water stress when it is actually receiving sufficient water supply. This is accomplished by alternating drip irrigation to where only one side of the grapevine receives water at a time. The roots on the dry side of the vine produce abscisic acid that triggers some of the vine's physiological responses to water stress - reduced shoot growth, smaller berries size, etc. But because the vine is still receiving water on the other side the stress doesn't become so severe to where vital functions such as photosynthesis is compromised. Partial rootzone drying has been shown to significantly increase a vine's water use efficiency. While PRD is shown to slightly reduce leaf area, this is generally not a problem as overall yield is unaffected.

== Criticism and environmental issues ==
The practice of irrigation has its share of criticism and environmental concerns. In many European wine regions the practice is banned under the belief that irrigation can be detrimental to quality wine production. However, in the early 21st century some European countries have relaxed their irrigation laws or reevaluated the issue. Of the criticisms leveled towards irrigation, the most common is that it disrupts the natural expression of terroir in the land as well as the unique characteristics that comes with vintage variation. In regions that do not practice irrigation, the quality and styles of wines can be dramatically different from vintage to vintage depending on weather conditions and rainfall. Irrigation's contribution to the broader globalization of wine is criticized as promoting a homogenization or "standardization" of wine.

Other criticisms center around the broader environmental impact of irrigation on both the ecosystem around the vineyard as well as the added strain on global water resources. While advances in drip irrigation has reduced the amount of waste water produced by irrigation, the irrigation of substantial tracts of land in areas like the San Joaquin Valley in California and the Murray-Darling Basin of Australia requires massive amounts of water from dwindling supplies. In Australia, the centuries-old practice of flood irrigation used in places like the Murrumbidgee Irrigation Area caused severe environmental damages from water-logging, increase salination and raising the water tables. In 2000, the Australian government invested over A$3.6 million into research on how to minimize the damage caused by extensive irrigation. In 2007, concerns about ecological damage to the Russian River caused government officials in California to take similar measures to cut back water supplies and promote more efficient irrigation practices.

== Other uses for irrigation systems ==
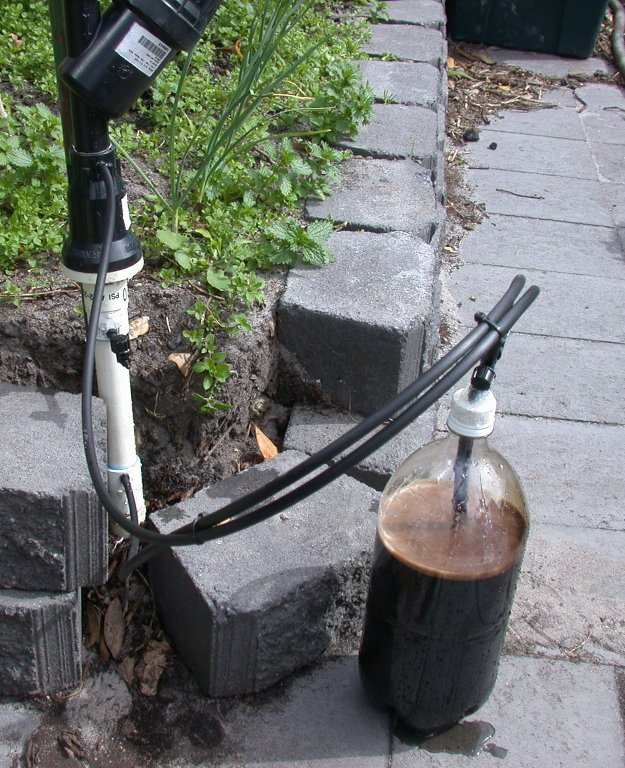
Drip irrigation systems can also be used to distribute controlled amounts of fertilization to the vines in a process known as "fertigation".

In addition to providing water for plant growth and development, irrigation systems can also be used for alternative purposes. One of the most common is the dual application of fertilizer with water in a process known as fertigation. Commonly used in drip irrigation systems, this method allows similarly regulate control over how precisely how much fertilizer and nutrients that each vine receives. Another alternative use for sprinkler irrigation systems can occur during the threat of winter or spring time frost. When temperature drop below 32 °F (0 °C), the vine is at risk of developing frost damage that could not only ruin the upcoming years harvest but also kill the vine. One preventive measure against frost damage is to use the sprinkler irrigation system to coat the vines with a protective layer of water that freezes into ice. This layer of ice serves as insulation keeping the internal temperature of the vine from dropping below the freezing mark.
