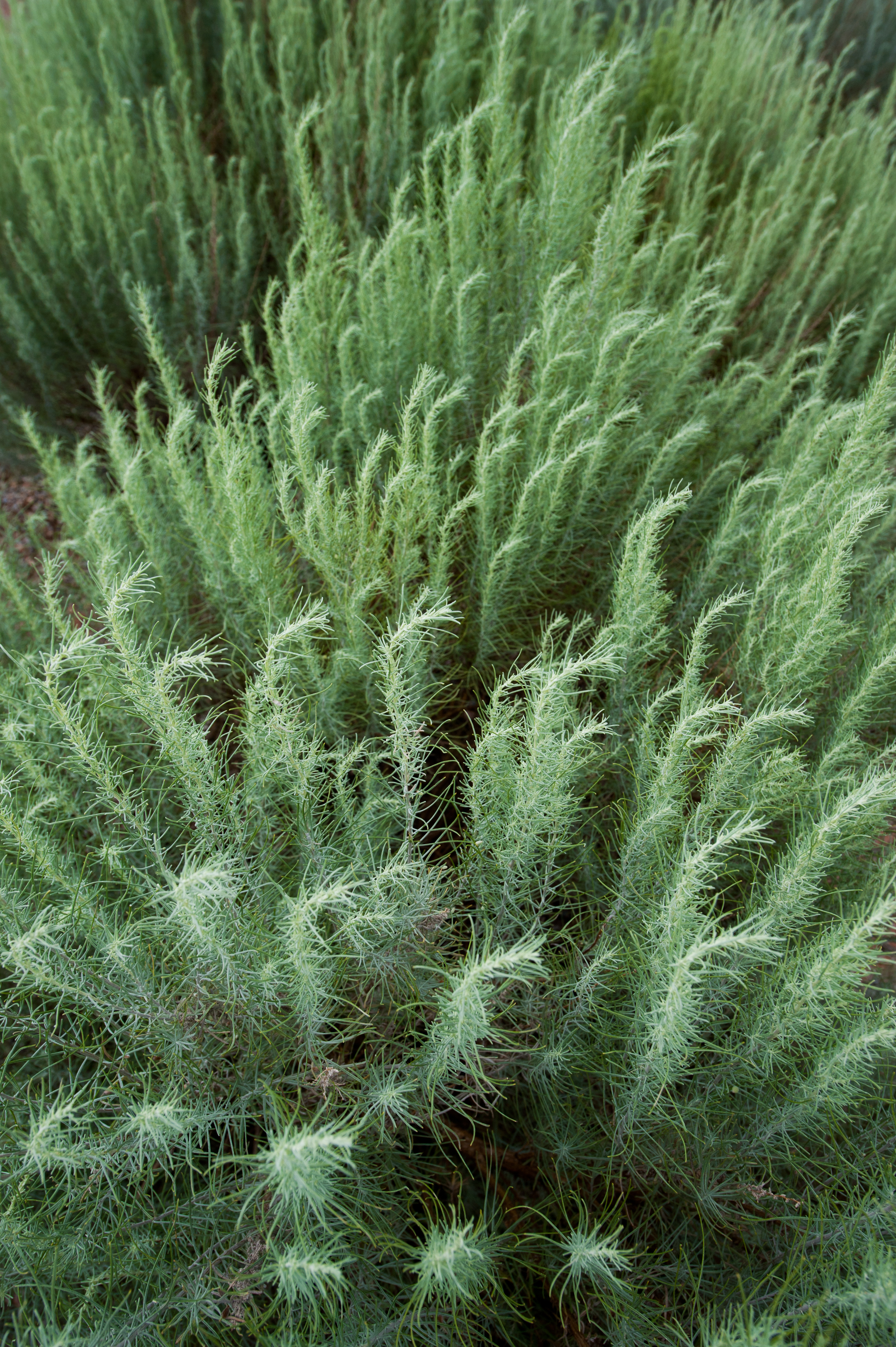

Conservation status
- Secure (NatureServe)

Scientific classification
- Kingdom: Plantae
- Clade: Tracheophytes
- Clade: Angiosperms
- Clade: Eudicots
- Clade: Asterids
- Order: Asterales
- Family: Asteraceae
- Genus: Artemisia
- Species: A. filifolia

Binomial name
- Artemisia filifolia Torr.

Synonyms
- Artemisia plattensis Nutt.; Oligosporus filifolius (Torr.) Poljakov; Oligosporus filifolius (Torr.) W.A.Weber

= Artemisia filifolia =

Species of flowering plant

Artemisia filifolia, known by common names including sand sagebrush, sand sage and sandhill sage, is a species of flowering plant in the aster family. It is native to North America, where it occurs from Nevada east to South Dakota and from there south to Arizona, Chihuahua, and Texas.

== Description ==
Artemisia filifolia is a branching woody shrub growing up to 1.5 metres (4 ft 11 in) tall. The stems are covered narrow, threadlike leaves up to 8 centimetres (3.1 in) long and no more than half a millimeter wide. The leaves are sometimes split into segments. They are solitary or arranged in fascicles. The inflorescence is a panicle of hanging flower heads. Each head contains sterile disc florets and 2 to 3 fertile ray florets. The fruit is a tiny achene. The achenes do not tend to disperse far from the parent plant. The leaf color is grayish-green. The flower color is either yellow or brown. The bloom time is between the months of August, September, October, and November.

== Ecology ==
Artemisia filifolia is a dominant species across much of the west-central United States, particularly in areas where the substrate is a deep, sandy soil. It is an indicator of sandy soils. It is efficient for preventing erosion on such soils. It is common in parts of the Great Plains, where it is a dominant component of prairie, grassland, and shrubland ecosystems alongside grasses such as sand bluestem, grama grasses, sand reedgrass, little bluestem, and sand dropseed. Some regions dominated by this sagebrush include the occurrences of the sandsage prairie from Nebraska to central Texas, various river systems in eastern Colorado and Kansas, the sandhills and mixed-grass prairies of Colorado, and parts of southeastern Wyoming. In Texas, it is common in the Trans-Pecos region, where it grows with honey mesquite, and many other areas in the state where it grows with sand shinnery oak.

This ecosystem is most commonly affected by fire and grazing. Before modern fire suppression, the ecosystem was maintained by a pattern of disturbance caused by natural wildfire and grazing by bison, a pattern which is called pyric herbivory.

== Rangeland impact ==
When humans began to use this terrain as rangeland, this system was altered, causing a homogenization of life forms in the habitat. A balanced regime of fire and grazing is required to sustain the biodiversity of this type of rangeland. Fire also helps prevent the succession of woody vegetation onto shrublands. The sagebrush is tolerant of fire, resprouting vigorously after its aboveground parts are burned away.

== Ecosystem ==
Sand sagebrush ecosystems are important habitat types for many animals. Prairie dogs build towns in sandy sage grassland, and when they abandon them, burrowing owls move in. Sage grouse live in sand sagebrush, though they prefer big sagebrush. Some animals eat the seeds, such as lesser prairie chickens and scaled quail. Lesser prairie chickens also use it for cover and nesting purposes. Extensive removal of sand sagebrush has been shown to reduce the diversity and abundance of breeding birds in the habitat.

Despite its importance in numerous ecosystems, this sagebrush can become a troublesome weed. One method of control is burning, then placing livestock where they will graze the new sprouts as they come up. It is also controlled with herbicides and mowing.

== Commercial use ==
Sand sagebrush seed is sold commercially. It is sometimes used for revegetation efforts on rangeland and coalfields. The Navajo had several uses for the plant. It was used medicinally and for ritual purposes. Being quite soft, it was used as toilet paper.
