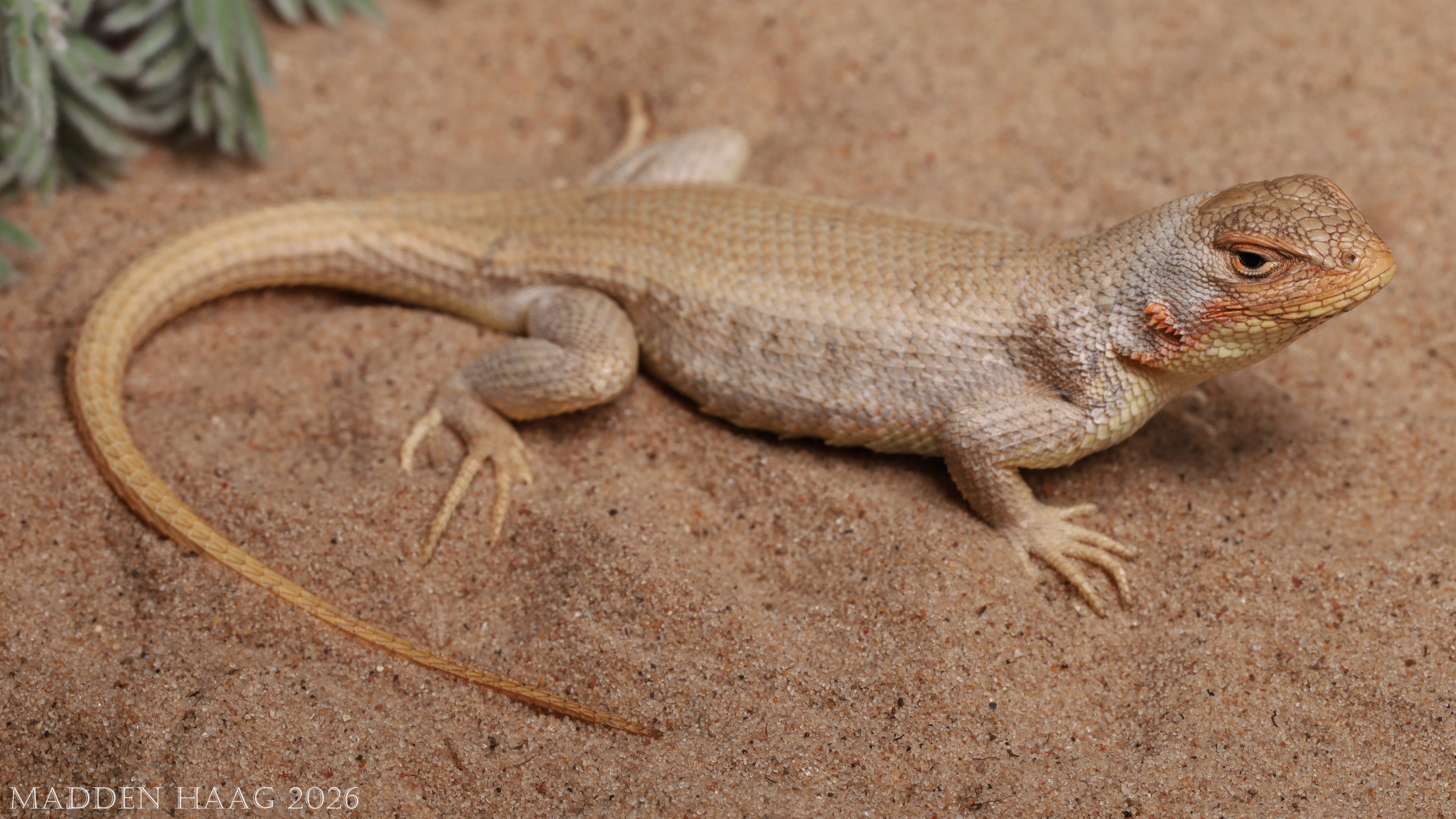

Conservation status
- Vulnerable (IUCN 3.1)

- Endangered (ESA)

Scientific classification
- Kingdom: Animalia
- Phylum: Chordata
- Class: Reptilia
- Order: Squamata
- Suborder: Iguania
- Family: Phrynosomatidae
- Genus: Sceloporus
- Species: S. arenicolus

Binomial name
- Sceloporus arenicolus Degenhardt & Jones, 1972

Synonyms
- Sceloporus graciosus arenicolus Degenhardt & Jones, 1972

= Sceloporus arenicolus =

Species of lizard

Sceloporus arenicolus, the dunes sagebrush lizard, also known as the sand dune lizard and the dunes-sagebrush lizard, is an insectivorous spiny lizard species (Note: Formerly classified as a subspecies of sagebrush lizard with the scientific name Sceloporus graciosus arenicolus) which only occurs in the shinnery oak sand dune systems of southeast New Mexico and only five counties in adjacent Texas.

== Habitat ==
Their habitat is restricted to semi-stabilized sand dunes which include large networks of shinnery oak (Quercus havardii), short (<2 m) shrubs, and sand sagebrush (Artemisia filifolia) on sloping, sandy topography, where the lizards use "blowouts" as their primary microhabitat. Blowouts are sandy, bowl-shaped interruptions in the shinnery oak sand dune system which look like small meteor craters. The roots of the shinnery oak shrubs provide structure for the dunes sagebrush lizards' burrows, where the lizards retreat from the blowouts when the sand surface is too hot or cold.

== Threats ==
Habitat destruction is their primary threat. Shinnery oak through much of the lizard's range was sprayed with herbicide to clear the land for cattle grazing, and the lizards are now extinct at these locations. The dune systems are also heavily interrupted by oil industry activities. These interruptions allow Mesquite to invade areas where shinnery oak (and dunes sagebrush lizards) were once dominant. While herbicide spraying has been outlawed in the dunes sagebrush lizard's New Mexico distribution, development for the oil industry has not ceased.

Competition from other lizard species may be a threat, as well. Uta stansburiana, the side-blotched lizard, seems to be more of a habitat generalist than the dunes sagebrush lizard, and may be able to take advantage of recent habitat changes, introducing skewed resource competition that is not natural for that ecosystem.

The United States Fish and Wildlife Service proposed listing the dunes sagebrush lizard as endangered under the Endangered Species Act throughout its range in New Mexico and Texas. The final determination was originally due in July 2011, but was delayed to allow the scientific community to continue research to see if the listing was necessary. In June 2012 the Fish and Wildlife Service decided not to list it, citing the "unprecedented commitments to voluntary conservation agreements now in place in New Mexico and Texas" that provide for the long-term conservation of the species. In May 2024, the Fish and Wildlife Service published a final rule to list the lizard as an endangered species, citing future energy development, sand mining and climate change as the biggest threats to its survival. The Fish and Wildlife Service estimates that 35% of the lizard's approximately 520,161 acres (2,105.02 km^{2}) of shinnery oak habitat has been degraded to the point it is no longer likely to have viable populations of the species, and that 47% of the species' geographic range has experienced habitat loss to the point of causing significant population declines. Areas where habitat quality was high were disconnected to other sand dune habitats and relatively small. Rangewide population data was not available at the time of listing, but the Fish and Wildlife Service concluded that "the risk factors acting on the dunes sagebrush lizard and its habitat, either singly or in combination, are of sufficient imminence, intensity, and magnitude to indicate that the species is in danger of extinction throughout all of its range."

In June 2026, the second Trump administration reached an agreement in a lawsuit by Texas Attorney General Ken Paxton challenging the designation. Under the agreement, "the Final Rule would be vacated and (...) the Service would issue a new finding on the (...) lizard’s status."
