= Biotic interchange =

Biogeography process

Biotic interchange is the process by which species from one biota invade another biota, usually due to the disappearance of a previously impassable barrier. These dispersal barriers can be physical, climatic, or biological and can include bodies of water or ice, land features like mountains, climate zones, or competition between species. Biotic interchange has been documented to occur in marine, freshwater, and terrestrial environments.

== Causes ==
The general cause of a biotic interchange is the disappearance of a barrier that had been previously blocking the dispersal of species from two distinct biotas. The disappearance of a barrier could be from the closing of a sea, connecting two previously unconnected continents; the melting of glaciers, allowing for migration across newly exposed areas that had been covered by ice; from sea level change, covering a land bridge would allow for marine interchange, while revealing a land bridge would allow for terrestrial interchange; and, it could also be from changing ocean currents, allowing for larval dispersal to new territories.

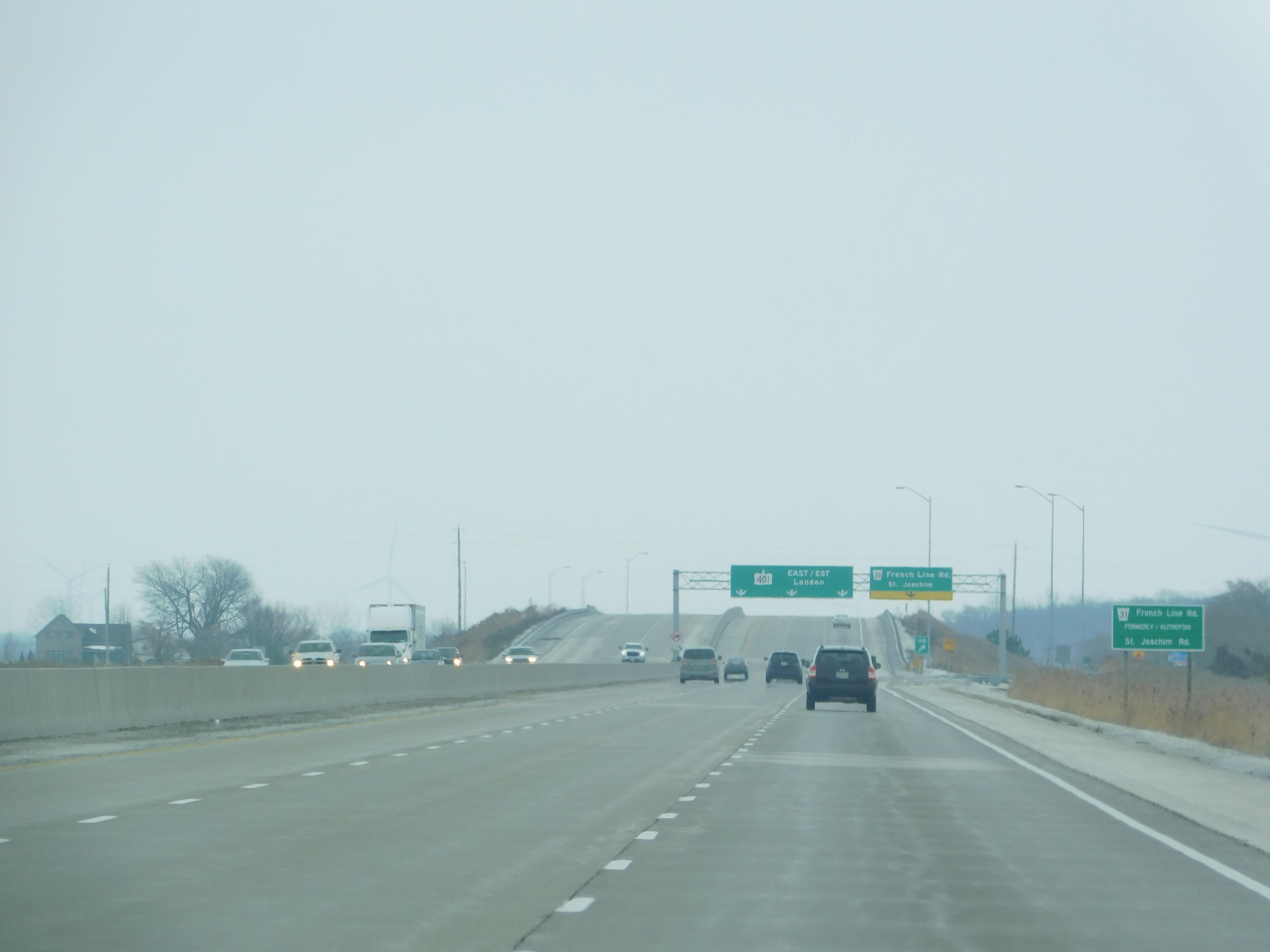
Highways are one example of a manmade dispersal barrier.

Humans have also become a vector of biotic interchange. They have fragmented species habitat by blocking interchange in some regions. Yet, humans have also intentionally and unintentionally spread many non-native species around the globe. Climate change may also be impacting the effectiveness of natural dispersal barriers.

== Effects ==
Sometimes an interchange can result in the extinction of some species. These species may go extinct due to the introduction of a predator that they are not adapted to, or due to more successful competition by invading species. However, invading species can coexist with native species for millions of years after an invasion. Sometimes invading species can also improve biodiversity by increasing genetic diversity.

Another effect of biotic interchange is homogenization. This occurs when many invading species from both biotas become established, creating one similar biota.

== Asymmetry ==
Many of the biotic interchanges studied have shown an asymmetry in the sharing of species between two biotas. Typically there is a donor biota and a recipient biota, with the donor biota sharing more species than the recipient biota. As an example, when the Suez Canal connected the Red Sea and Mediterranean Sea, most new species in the Mediterranean originated in the Red Sea (91 molluscs, 15 crabs, and 41 fish). Fewer species travelled from the Mediterranean into the Red Sea (3 molluscs, 0 crabs, and 6 fish).

Invading species from the donor biota are often only a small percent of the potential invaders available within that biota. That is to say, that not all species that could invade another biota do invade. For example, only about 4.3% of the total fish species in the Red Sea have actually invaded the Mediterranean.

=== Hypotheses ===
There are many hypotheses that attempt to explain the asymmetry and general processes involved in biotic interchange:

- The null hypothesis suggests that the number of species invading a recipient biota should be proportional to the number of species available in the donor biota. However, comparisons of many biotic interchanges reveal that this is not true.
- The hypothesis of ecological opportunity suggests that the number of species invading a recipient biota should be proportional to the number of species that go extinct in the recipient biota.
- The biogeographic superiority hypothesis suggests that over time the species in one region would evolve superiority over species in a different region, and would thus be better at invading.
- The universal trade off hypothesis suggests that species with similar life habits separated for long periods of geologic time may still be able to coexist if brought back together due to the presence of similar evolutionary pressures affecting their past adaptation to their surroundings.

== Past ==
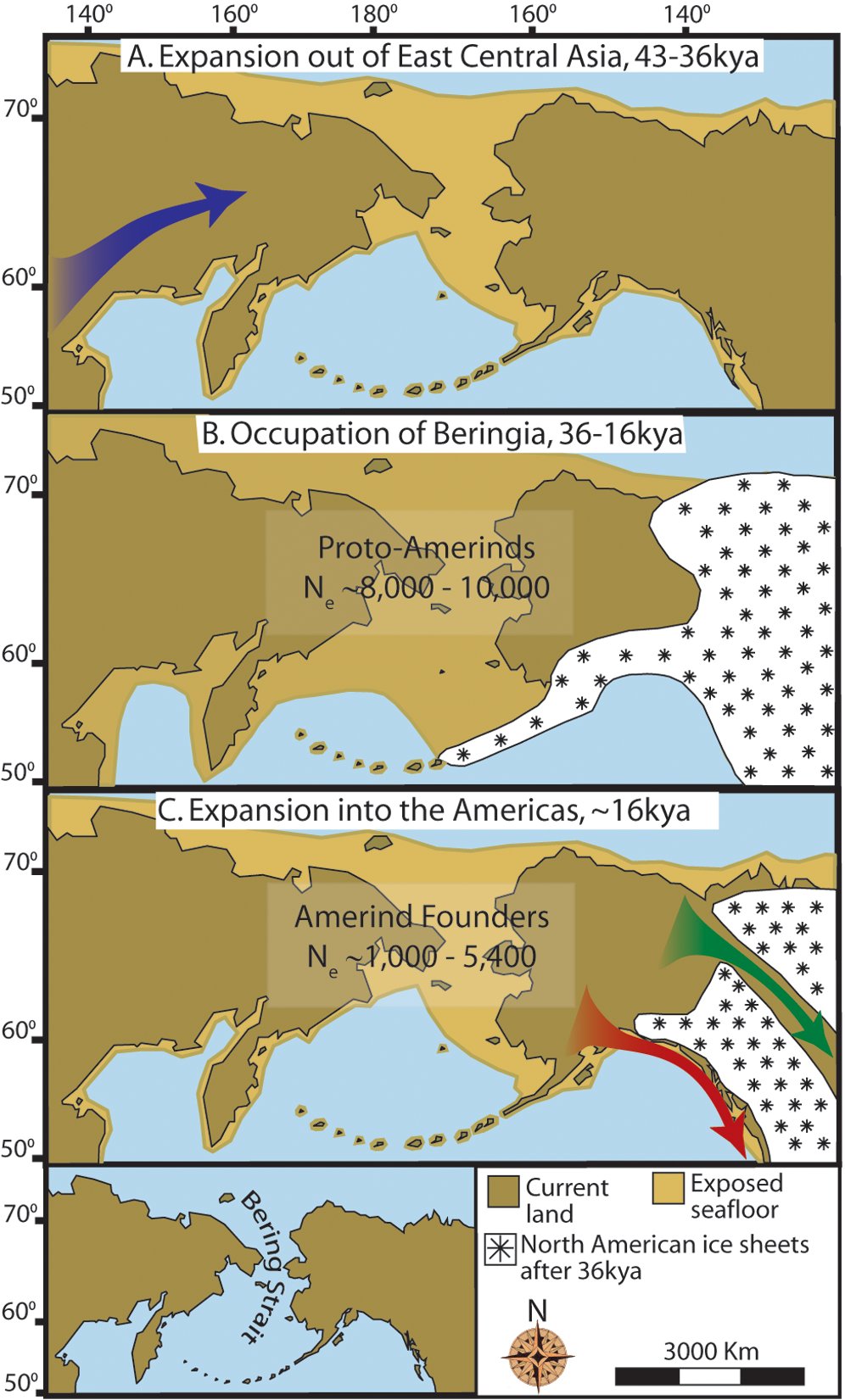
This map shows the Bering land bridge that allowed for the hypothesized invasion of humans from Asia into North America. It also shows the reestablishment of the Bering Strait after the glaciation, allowing for the interchange of marine organisms between the Pacific and Arctic Oceans.

During the Trans-Arctic Interchange (3.5 million years ago, Early Pliocene) sea levels rose, submerging the Bering Strait, and allowing marine organisms from the North Pacific and North Atlantic/Arctic Ocean to come into contact with each other.

During the Great American Interchange (3 million years ago, Pliocene) tectonic forces pushed North and South America together, allowing for the formation of the Panamanian land bridge linking the two continents together. This event has been extensively studied.

The Indian Subcontinent and Mainland Asia Interchange (Eocene) was the collision of the Indian Plate with mainland Asia allowing for biotic interchange mainly from mainland Asia onto the Indian subcontinent.

Bering Land Bridge Interchange (late Cenozoic) was an interchange between Asian and North American land species across the Bering land bridge.

The African and Eurasian Interchange (18 million years ago, early Miocene) occurred between Africa and Eurasia through the Middle East after the Tethys sea closed.

== Present ==
The Trans-Suez Interchange is a human-induced biotic interchange between the Mediterranean and the Red Sea due to the construction of the Suez canal.

Another human-induced biotic interchange, the Japan–North American Interchange, is between marine species off the coast of Japan and North America. These species are transported as larvae in ships' ballast.

The Panama Canal Interchange between the eastern Pacific and western Atlantic oceans through the Panama Canal. This interchange has been relatively minimal due to the canal containing freshwater.
