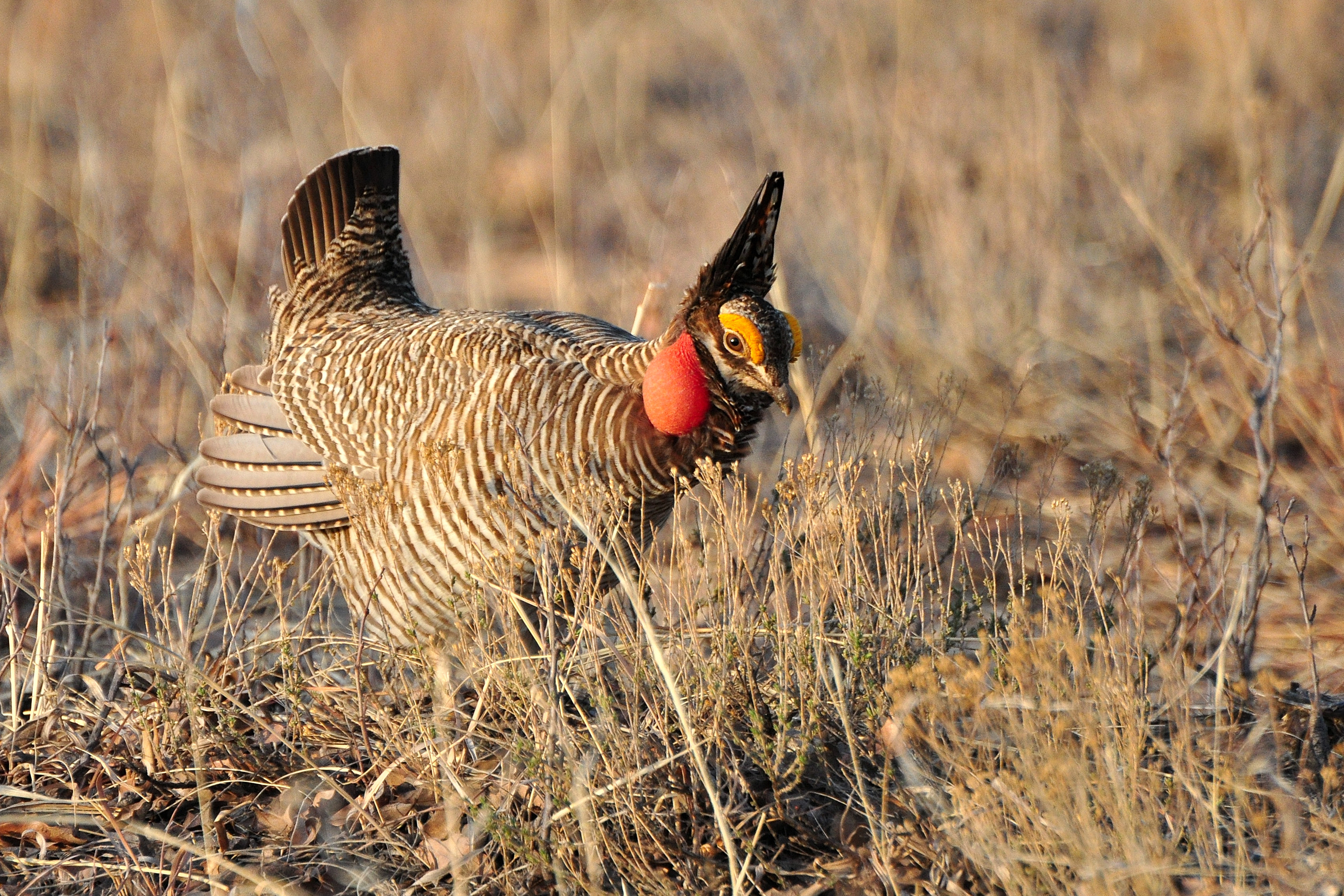
- A lesser prairie chicken in New Mexico

Conservation status
- Vulnerable (IUCN 3.1)

Scientific classification
- Kingdom: Animalia
- Phylum: Chordata
- Class: Aves
- Order: Galliformes
- Family: Phasianidae
- Genus: Tympanuchus
- Species: T. pallidicinctus

Binomial name
- Tympanuchus pallidicinctus (Ridgway, 1873)
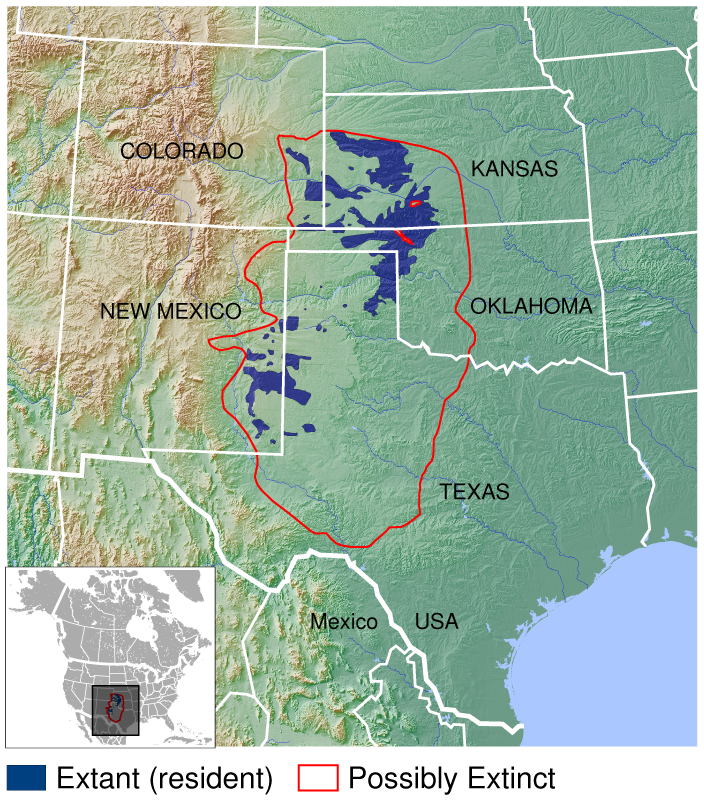
- Lesser prairie-chicken range.

Synonyms
- Tympanuchus cupido pallidicinctus

= Lesser prairie-chicken =

Species of bird

The lesser prairie-chicken (Tympanuchus pallidicinctus) is a species in the grouse tribe.

== Description ==
Adult individuals are medium to large birds, striped white and brown like its near relative, the Greater prairie-chicken (T. cupido), though it is smaller and paler. Adults range from 15.0 to 16.1 inches (38 to 41 cm) in length and 22.1 to 28.7 ounces (630 to 810 g) in weight. Mature males sport yellow, comb-like feathers above each eye, as well as long head feathers that can be raised to show their pinkish-red Gular sacs. One is present on each side of the neck, which becomes inflated to be used in mating displays.

== Distribution and habitat ==
About half of its current population lives in western Kansas, with the other half in the sandhills and prairies of western Oklahoma, the Texas Panhandle including the Llano Estacado, eastern New Mexico, and southeastern Colorado.

They prefer environments containing sand sagebrush and shinnery oak, as well as various grasses and shrubs depending on the area.

== Behavior ==
Like its larger relative, it is known for its lekking behavior, particularly the "booming" call produced during mating displays. They typically prefer wide, open areas such as hills and ridges with short grass for their leks, however the use of man-made structures such as roads or oil platforms has also been observed. During the months of April and May, males will establish an area for themselves and potential mates, and will typically become territorial as the spring season progresses. This process is repeated to a lesser degree in the fall, beginning as early as late August and reaching a height in October. Males in particular are likely to return to the same territory repeatedly.

Females will begin nesting following mating, most frequently in May. Nests are dug about 5–10 cm into the ground, with a width of up to 20cm. These nests are lined with grasses, leaves, and feathers, and may be located within taller grasses or beneath brush and shrubs for shade and shelter. A single brood usually contains 11–14 eggs, hatching about 23 days after being laid. Chicks become fledged within 4 weeks, and after 8–10, will be left on their own as the mother hen leaves to molt.

== Diet ==
The majority of the lesser prairie-chicken's diet consists of foraged seeds, insects, and crops, as well as leaves, fruits, and forb buds. All of these are eaten year-round based on availability, however adolescents under 10 weeks tend to eat mostly insects, and adults will as well during warmer months. In fall, they will mostly shift to eating seeds, as well as leaves and flowers in winter months. When available, crops such as corn and grains will be eaten if left out. Generally, this diet provides them with enough water to survive, and they will rarely drink directly without cover unless absolutely necessary.

== Conservation ==
Considered "vulnerable" by the IUCN due to its restricted and patchy range, it is vulnerable to habitat destruction, due to a combination of droughts, oil contamination, woody plant encroachment, and conversion to farmland. The lesser prairie-chicken's habitat has been reduced by 85%, and their population has declined by about 97% since 1800, in part due to unrestricted hunting. Of the remaining patches of suitable habitat, only around 0.1% are sufficiently contiguous to sustain even a minimum population of the birds. There is evidence suggesting that global warming may have a particularly detrimental influence by greatly reducing the size of the sagebrush ecosystem. Subfossil remains are known, e.g., from Rocky Arroyo in the Guadalupe Mountains, outside the species' current range but where more habitat existed in the less humid conditions in the outgoing last ice age. Range contraction apparently took place no later than about 8000 BC.

=== Threatened and endangered species listings ===
On March 27, 2014, the lesser prairie-chicken was listed as threatened under the Endangered Species Act but the listing was vacated in 2015 following a legal challenge. On June 1, 2021, the US Fish and Wildlife Service (USFWS) proposed splitting the species into two segments. The northern one, covering Oklahoma, Colorado, Kansas, and a portion of Texas, would be listed as threatened, and the southern one, covering New Mexico and a portion of Texas, as endangered. On November 17, 2022, the USFWS published a final rule listing the Southern Distinct Population Segment (DPS) of the lesser prairie-chicken as endangered and the Northern DPS as threatened. Implementation of the rule was delayed, and it took effect on March 27, 2023.

In 2015, Senator Jerry Moran (R-Kan) introduced an amendment to legislation authorizing construction of the Keystone XL Pipeline that would overturn the listing. He disputed the listing as, "... another example of unnecessary intrusion into private lives and businesses by the federal government." His action was supported by the American Energy Alliance and opposed by the League of Conservation Voters.

When the Senate voted on the Keystone bill, it did not get the 60 votes in favor that was required to pass. It got only 53 Republican and one Democratic Senator to vote in favor.

The United States Department of the Interior proposed creating a lesser prairie-chicken preserve as a national monument, but action was never taken action on the proposal.

In May 2023, the U.S. Senate voted to strip the lesser prairie-chicken of its new listing using its authority under the Congressional Review Act. President Joe Biden's administration threatened to veto the bill if the House of Representatives passed it, which the House did on July 27. The bill was passed by the Senate, but vetoed by Biden on September 27, 2023. On March 29, 2025, U.S. District Judge David Counts vacated both the northern and southern DPS listings by court order; the U.S. Fish and Wildlife Service published the formal delisting in the Federal Register on February 26, 2026, removing all ESA protections from the species.
