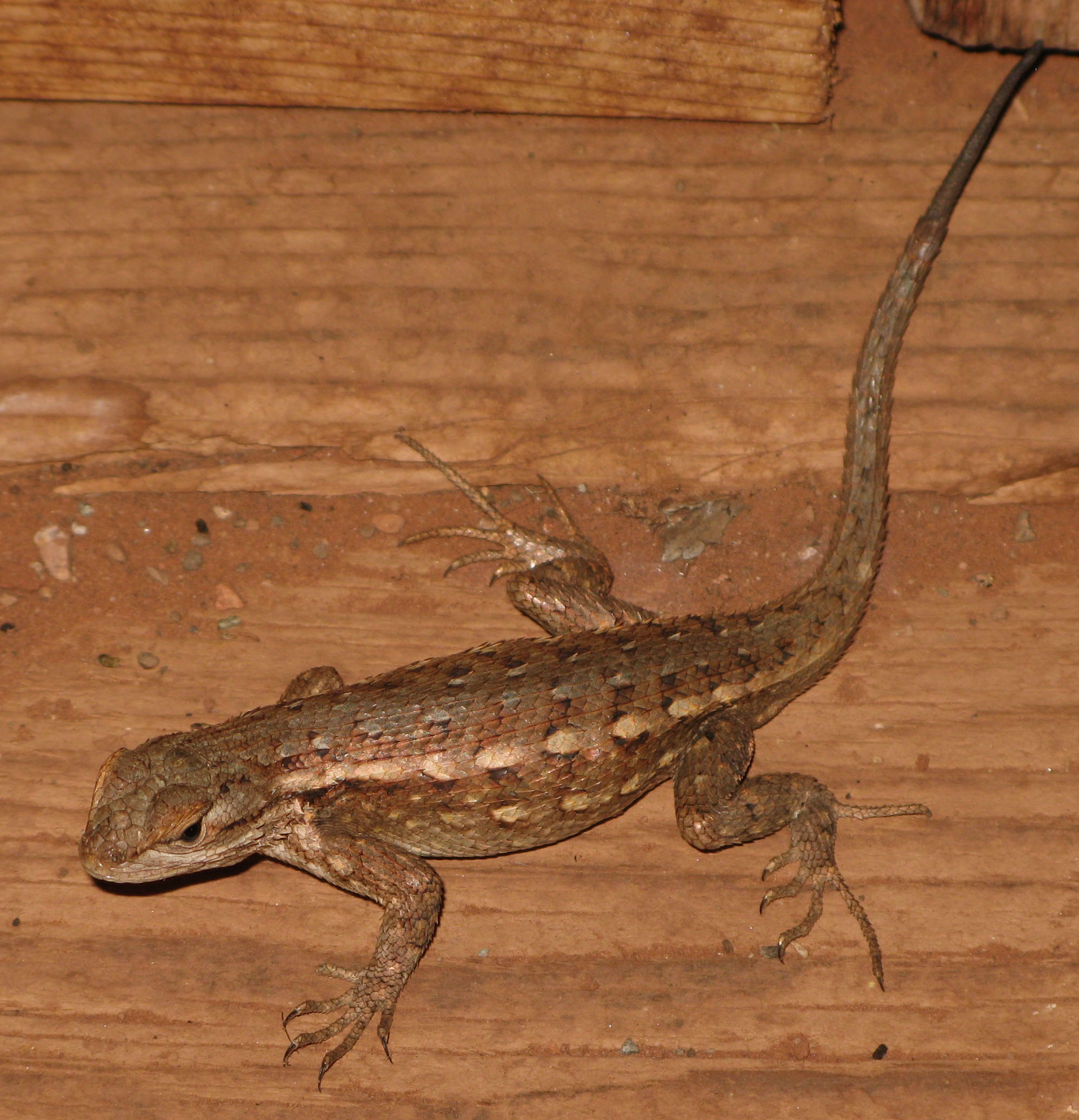

Conservation status
- Least Concern (IUCN 3.1)

Scientific classification
- Kingdom: Animalia
- Phylum: Chordata
- Class: Reptilia
- Order: Squamata
- Suborder: Iguania
- Family: Phrynosomatidae
- Genus: Sceloporus
- Species: S. graciosus

Binomial name
- Sceloporus graciosus Baird & Girard, 1852
- Natural range of Sceloporus graciosus, estimated with iNaturalist Geomodel

= Sagebrush lizard =

Species of lizard

The sagebrush lizard or sagebrush swift (Sceloporus graciosus) is a common species of phrynosomatid lizard found at mid to high altitudes in the western United States. It belongs to the genus Sceloporus (spiny lizards) in the Phrynosomatidae family of reptiles. Named after the sagebrush plants near which it is commonly found, the sagebrush lizard has keeled and spiny scales running along its dorsal surface.

The sagebrush lizard is similar to the western fence lizard, another Sceloporus species found in the western US. The sagebrush lizard can be distinguished from the western fence lizard in that the former is on average smaller and has finer scales. The keeled dorsal scales are typically gray or tan, but can be a variety of colors. The main (ground) color is broken by a lighter gray or tan stripe running down the center of the back (vertebral stripe) and two light stripes, one on either side of the lizard (dorsolateral stripes). S. graciosus will sometimes have orange markings on its sides.

Three regional races of the sagebrush lizard are recognized: the southern sagebrush lizard lives in Southern California, and the western and northern races are found in many western states, including Nevada, Oregon, Idaho, Colorado, Montana, Washington, New Mexico, Utah, Wyoming, North Dakota, South Dakota, Nebraska, and Arizona.

== Physical description ==
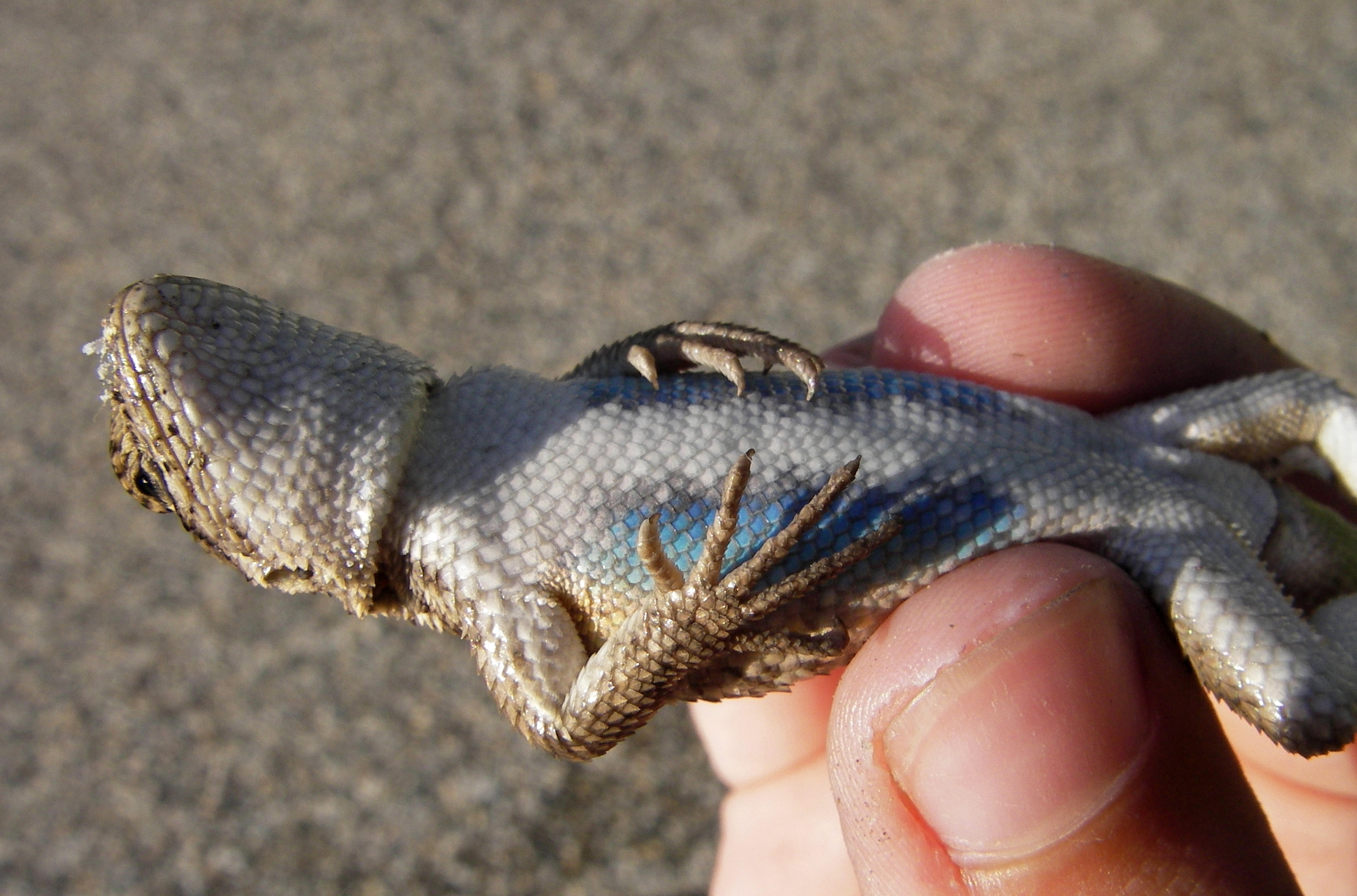
The blue ventral patches of a male sagebrush lizard

The sagebrush lizard is usually 4.7–8.9 cm (1.9–3.5 in) snout-to-vent length (SVL) when fully grown. Hatchlings are about 25 mm (0.98 in) SVL. The sagebrush lizard looks very similar to the western fence lizard, but differs in that it is typically smaller and has an increased number of scales. In appearance, sagebrush lizards are grey, brown or olive, with hints of blue or green on the dorsal surface during the light phase, and they often have irregular banding patterns on the body and tail. They also often display a black bar on the shoulder, and a light lateral and dorsolateral line on both sides. The scales on the rear portion of the thigh are small and granular, while the armpit and lateral surface of the body is often rust-colored. Females have white or yellow bellies, and males have distinctive blue patches on the abdomen and throat, although the throat patch can be absent. Males also have enlarged postanal scales, and two areas of swelling at the base of the tail. During the breeding season, males may develop orange breeding colors. Young lizards look similar to adults, but lack the dark blue markings.

=== Elevation-dependent variation in growth rate ===
In SW Utah, the sagebrush lizards exhibit unexpected growth patterns. Lizards who live in higher elevations grow faster than lizards who live in areas that are at lower elevations, even though the lizards that live at higher elevation have shorter daily and seasonal activity. It is hypothesized that the differences in growth is because lizards at a higher elevation have lower resting metabolic expenditure compared to those at a lower elevation. When these metabolic rates were measured and compared in lizards from both elevations, the resting metabolic rates were found to be lower for lizards at a higher elevation and higher for lizards at a lower elevation. For the lizards at a lower elevation, the daily resting metabolic expenditure was 50% higher which means 12.5% more energy that could be used for growth was being used up in comparison to higher elevation lizards.

The growth patterns of sagebrush lizards seem to be dependent on the daily and seasonal activity rather than adaptation to the local environment. Lizards with longer periods of seasonal activity have larger maximal adult body sizes. The sagebrush lizard population in Mt. Rose, CA has a 60% longer activity season than those in Kolbo Mesa, UT. The energy budgets of the lizards in California are 60% larger than those in Utah, and subsequently, these lizards are larger than those from Utah. However, sagebrush lizards that exist at a higher elevation in SW Utah show a paradoxical pattern. They have shorter daily and seasonal activity periods, but they reach the same adult body size. They have 400hr less time for seasonal activity over the course of a season, but they grow faster. When these lizards were taken into the lab setting and variables were controlled for, they both grew at similar rates despite their population of origin. This means that there is less food at lower elevations, the intensity of foraging is lower at these elevations, or growth processes are more efficient for the lizard population at higher elevations. Essentially, animal growth can increase either by eating more food or by utilizing the energy from food more efficiently. If food availability is the same and if lizards consume the same amount of food, then energy expenditure is another explanation for divergent population growth because energy expenditure is lower for lizards at higher elevations so they can allocate more energy for their growth.

== Geographic distribution ==
The geographic range of S. graciosus includes much of the western United States. It can be found throughout Utah, Nevada, southern Idaho, northern Arizona, northwestern New Mexico, Texas, and western Colorado. It is also widely distributed throughout areas of Wyoming, Oregon, California, Washington, western North Dakota, South Dakota, and Nebraska. The sagebrush lizard has been found to live at elevations ranging from 500 to 10,500 ft (150 to 3,200 m).

=== Geographic variation based on thermal constraints ===
Within the sagebrush lizard population, there is a pattern of geographic variation within body size and it is thought that thermal constraints may be an influencing factor. Generally speaking, longer seasonal activity is associated with large adult body size and this translates into increased lizard growth because they spend more time foraging. These growth differences can also be explained through biophysical constraints on foraging activity, food availability, or thermal constraints that cause variation in net energy assimilation.

Through the study done by Michael Sears in the paper "Geographic variation in the life history of the sagebrush lizard: the role of thermal constraints on activity", it can be seen that patterns of growth of sagebrush lizards are not solely dependent on thermal constraints. If there is less opportunity for thermal activity, high elevations, this should result in lizards with smaller adult body sizes. However, it is seen that sagebrush lizards at high elevations exhibit faster growth despite the shorter seasonal activity and cooler environmental temperatures. Lizards at these higher elevations also have a higher risk of mortality. In order to understand why growth rates do not increase with increased thermal opportunity for activity, it is important to consider that food availability is correlated with growth. Food availability and species' access to the food is difficult to analyze. Sagebrush lizards are better physiologically adapted to lower food levels because they had lower lipid utilization and they extracted more usable energy for metabolism from their food sources. Intraspecific interactions can limit individual's access to food as well. Additionally, the spatial distribution of environmental temperatures that are operative for lizards will constrain the time when they can be active. These lizards use radiant energy to raise their body temperatures. The time lizards spend thermoregulating their microhabitats can take away from foraging, courtship, and predator avoidance.

== Habitat ==
The sagebrush lizard is commonly observed in shrublands, but is also found in a variety of other habitats including coniferous forests, and piñon-juniper woodlands. They will bask on logs and rocky outcrops. They spend most of their time on the ground; however, they have the capability to climb to escape predators.

== Behavior ==
The sagebrush lizard is easily frightened and will immediately seek refuge in crevices, brush, rodent burrows, rocks, or trees when alarmed. One investigator observed that, under conditions where a lizard might be at threat of predation, the lizard would sometimes stay still and play dead. Individuals bask on the ground, on low branches of bushes, and on low boulders. Mammal burrows and rock crevices may serve as hibernation sites during cold periods. Activity is almost exclusively diurnal. The length of the warm-season activity varies geographically and from year to year, but at most localities, individuals are active from March or April to late September or early October. Juveniles appear to be active later in the autumn than adults.

Significant seasonal movement or migration has not been reported for this species. Lizards may occasionally move outside the normal area of activity to find suitable nest sites for egg-laying, or to find hibernation sites. Males are more active, especially in the spring, and have larger home ranges than females, although home range size is small.

The sagebrush lizard brumates during winter weather. The duration of the inactive period varies with local climate (in Idaho, adults are active from mid-April to September, while activity of juveniles peaks in August). It is the most common lizard on Idaho sagebrush plains. In Washington, this lizard is primarily associated with sand dunes and other sandy habitats that support shrubs and have large areas of bare ground. Sagebrush lizards bask in the morning and late afternoon. Typically, they can be seen on the ground at the edge of shrubs or other vegetation that provide cover from predators. When ground temperatures become hot, they move into the low branches of shrubs or under vegetation. At night, on rainy days and on cool, butty days, they move underground or shelter under debris.

Sagebrush lizards eat a variety of insects, such as ants, beetles, grasshoppers, flies, hemipterans, and lepidopterans; they also eat arachnids. Western fence lizards are a chief food competitor with them in areas where their distributions overlap.

=== Reproductive isolation and speciation ===
Females' choice of male partners can result in reproductive isolation and speciation. Isolation can also be caused by male mating preferences or aggressive mating encounters. In the study done by Bissell et al. in "Male approach and female avoidance as mechanisms of population discrimination in sagebrush lizards", discriminatory trials were conducted to study behavioral mechanism of sagebrush lizards' population discrimination. The questions they asked were whether population-level discrimination varies in strength in relation to geographic distance between populations, whether it is more apparent in inter or intra sexual interactions, and if it takes the form of attraction or avoidance. Through these studies, a majority of the population-level discrimination was exhibited by male lizards who preferred to associate with particular females, and female lizards who avoided certain types of males. Male attraction and female avoidance play significant roles in population discrimination, speciation, and reproductive isolation.

Sagebrush lizards are involved with many forms of social interactions and they are involved with reproductive isolation. Male and female lizards defend territories and during their active seasons, they engage with a lot of social interactions. This study aimed to determine whether the sagebrush lizards from eastern Oregon could distinguish between lizards in their population and four different populations.

The study showed that population discrimination mainly occurs when males are attracted to particular females, but females avoid certain males. It is not really dependent on female choice. In terms of reproductive isolation in territorial species where mate choice is interconnected with spatial relationships, male attraction and female avoidance are particularly important mechanisms. Male choice seems to play a significant role in preferences and it can significantly impact the frequency or quality of courtship and female receptivity.

Other important factors are body size and color. These serve as signal traits for population-level discrimination. The males tended to associate with the larger of the females they were presented with. Since larger mass is an indicator that the female is gravid and receptive to courtship, it seems probable that males would prefer this size of lizard. Furthermore, color cues could also be a good distinguishing feature.

Lastly, the study determined that the pattern of discrimination with geographic distance is quite complicated. When they performed simultaneous-choice trials, there really was no significant relationship between geographic distance and discrimination levels. The populations they compared are from similar desert habitats, but over time, they probably have gone through rapid diversification of behavioral, physiological, and morphological traits. All of these factors result in population discrimination. This study cannot conclude whether the trait differences have an environmental or evolutionary basis or if they resulted from natural selection or by-products of genetic drift. Further studies would be required to conclude these details.

== Reproduction ==
Males defend territories both during and after the breeding season. Territorial defense is accomplished by posturing and physical combat. Male and female territories overlap, which enables the male lizards to court and mate with a few familiar females. Courtship involves head bob and shudder displays, and is physically demanding and time-consuming. Males are usually slightly larger than females. Sagebrush lizards mate in the spring, and have one or two clutches of two to ten eggs that are laid during late spring to midsummer. The eggs are laid about 1 inch (2.5 cm) deep in loose soil, usually at the base of a shrub. The eggs hatch in 45–75 days (approximately two months). Females in the northwestern range may produce two clutches. The young become sexually mature in the first (southern range) or second (northern range) year.

=== Courtship ===
For males to invest in courtship is a costly business. Not only does it require time and energy, but it also exposes males to competition and predatory behavior. However, courtship is very important in reproductive potential. The sagebrush males repeatedly visit the same females as they move through the various territories. Repeated courtship is even more costly, but for sagebrush lizards, it is a requirement for reproductive behavior. However, in order to slightly lower their courtship costs, they vary their courtship based on the female's reproductive state. If the female sagebrush was previously confronted by the male already during their bout of repeated courtship, then they are less likely to perform rejection behavior.

Within this lizard species, the male and female territories are overlapping and polygamous males are constantly exposed to females they have repeatedly courted or are familiar with. However, females are particularly picky and they exhibit many rejection displays, so males have realized that repeated courtship is necessary to allow male insemination.

In the study done by Mayte Ruiz et al. in "Courtship attention in sagebrush lizards varies with male identity and female reproductive state", they tested the possible predictors of male courtship behavior in S. graciosus. The predictions include individual variation among males, female reproductive state and female fitness.

Ultimately, it was found that male sagebrush lizards show individual differences in courtship behavior, but that behavior is mostly tailored to female reproductive fitness. The males displayed quite intensely towards females less far along in the reproductive cycle. Additionally, there were no preferences towards particular morphological features. In conclusion, males tend to minimize the cost of their courtship by interacting with each female and adapting their courtship behavior to their needs and current condition.

=== Male exploratory behavior ===
Another aspect of female sagebrush lizards that can influence male courtship is the amount of female courtship experience. In the study done by Mayte Ruiz in "Male Sagebrush Lizards Increase Exploratory Behavior Toward Females with More Courtship Experience", they used robotic lizards to present male courtship displays to females, either showing them a low or high quantity of displays. Male lizards were able to distinguish between females who received more courtships in the past and those who did not. Females did not differ in behavioral response because of the display treatments, but the males may detect differences in the females physiological state. The femoral pore secretion is influenced by the lizard's reproductive condition. For this reason, males might engage in exploratory chemical behaviors because of increased signals produced at different physiological stages.

Furthermore, males do not alter courtship behavior based on the female's previous display experience. In the case that males need to produce displays to accelerate females' reproductive states, males would actually be expected to produce their display behaviors toward any females that have not yet gone through the fertilization process. Male sagebrush lizards seem to display more toward females that are not in their gravid state. They also indiscriminately display towards unmated females, which would improve the females' receptivity. Lastly, they found that females tend to move away from males; however, males actively move towards females, regardless of the treatment they provide. Within many animal species and studies on sagebrush lizards, it has been found that females display their choice through differential avoidance of males. When they actively do not want to be courted by a particular male, they will move away from them to display their disinterest.

=== Egg development ===
In the lab, female sagebrush lizards laid 5 to 6 eggs that were 12 mm long. The eggs are laid in holes dug by the female, generally on a warm sunny slope. The shortest period of post-depositional development is about forty two days. They measured this by taking the number of days between the last date of capture of females with eggs and the first date of appearance of the young. The time when sagebrush lizards lay eggs is very variable in nature.

== Predators ==
Sagebrush lizards are important prey for a variety of vertebrate species in the western United States. Snakes, especially striped whipsnakes and night snakes, are the main predators of the lizards, but birds of prey also consume them in large quantities. Smaller carnivorous mammals and domesticated cats also prey on them. As of September 2020, a Trump administration proposal could open lands to more energy development and other activities. The dunes sagebrush lizard (Sceloporus arenicolus), a rare relative of the sagebrush lizard formerly classified as a subspecies, endemic to areas in western Texas and eastern New Mexico where oil deposits exist, could be affected by this federal change to the Endangered Species Act.

== Subspecies ==
There are two valid subspecies of the sagebrush lizard, which differ in their geographic distributions, markings, and number of scales.

- Sceloporus graciosus graciosus Baird & Girard, 1852 – northern sagebrush lizard
- Sceloporus graciosus gracilis Baird & Girard, 1852 – western sagebrush lizard

== Etymology ==
The subspecific name, vandenburgianus, is in honor of American herpetologist John Van Denburgh.

== Bibliography ==
- Baird, S.F.; Girard, C.F. (1852). "Characteristics of some New Reptiles in the Museum of the Smithsonian Institution". Proc. Acad. Nat. Sci. Philadelphia 6: 68–70. (Sceloporus graciosus, new species, p. 69).
- Burkholder, G.L. (1973). Life history and ecology of the Great Basin sagebrush swift, Sceloporus graciosus graciosus (Baird and Girard 1852). Brigham Young Univ: Ph.D. Thesis. 213 pp.
- Bursey, C.R.; Goldberg, S.R. (1991). "Monthly prevalences of Physaloptera retusa in naturally infected Yarrow's spiny lizard". Journal of Wildlife Diseases. 27 (4): 710–715. doi:10.7589/0090-3558-27.4.710. PMID 1758041.
- Cossel, John Jr. (1997). "Sceloporus graciosus ". Idaho Museum of Natural History.
- Deslippe, R.J.; M'Closkey, R.T. (1991). "Experimental Test of Mate Defense in an Iguanid Lizard (Sceloporus graciosus)". Ecology. 72 (4): 1218–1224. Bibcode:1991Ecol...72.1218D. doi:10.2307/1941095. JSTOR 1941095.
- Goldberg, S.R.; Bursey, C.R. (1997). "Persistence and Stability of the Component Helminth Community of the Sagebrush Lizard, Sceloporus graciosus (Phrynosomatidae) from Los Angeles County, California, 1972-1973, 1986-1996". The American Midland Naturalist. 138 (2): 418–421. doi:10.2307/2426835. JSTOR 2426835.
- Hogan, C.M. (2008). "Western fence lizard (Sceloporus occidentalis)". GlobalTwitcher.com. Archived from the original on 2012-09-05.
- Martins, E.P. (1993). "Contextual use of the push-up display by the sagebrush lizard, Sceloporus graciosus". Animal Behaviour. 45 (2): 25–36. doi:10.1006/anbe.1993.1003. S2CID 53193544.
- Montana Field Guide. "Common Sagebrush Lizard -- Sceloporus graciosus ". Mt.gov.
- Rose, B.R. (1976). "Habitat and prey selection of Sceloporus occidentalis and Sceloporus graciosus ". Ecology. 57 (3): 531–541. Bibcode:1976Ecol...57..531R. doi:10.2307/1936437. JSTOR 1936437.
- Rose, B.R. (1976). "Dietary Overlap of Sceloporus occidentalis and S. graciosus ". Copeia. 1976 (4): 818–820. doi:10.2307/1443474. JSTOR 1443474.
- Ruiz M.; Davis E.; Martins E.P. (2008). "Courtship attention in sagebrush lizards varies with male identity and female reproductive state". Behavioral Ecology. 19 (6): 1326–1332. doi:10.1093/beheco/arn072. PMC 2583109. PMID 19458780.
- Sears, M.W.; Angilletta, M.J. Jr. (2003). "Life-history variation in the sagebrush lizard: Phenotypic plasticity or local adaptation?". Ecology. 84 (6): 1624–1634. doi:10.1890/0012-9658(2003)084[1624:LVITSL]2.0.CO;2.
- Sears, M.W. (2005). "Geographic variation in the life history of the sagebrush lizard: the role of thermal constraints on activity". Oecologia. 143 (1): 25–36. Bibcode:2005Oecol.143...25S. doi:10.1007/s00442-004-1767-0. PMID 15742218. S2CID 26809726.
- Sears, M.W. (2005). "Resting metabolic expenditure as a potential source of variation in growth rates of the sagebrush lizard". Comparative Biochemistry and Physiology A. 140 (2): 171–177. doi:10.1016/j.cbpb.2004.12.003. PMID 15748856.
- Sinervo, B.; Adolph, S.C. (1994). "Growth Plasticity and Thermal Opportunity in Sceloporus Lizards". Ecology. 75 (3): 776–790. Bibcode:1994Ecol...75..776S. doi:10.2307/1941734. JSTOR 1941734.
- Stebbins, Robert C. (2003). A Field Guide to Western Reptiles and Amphibians (3rd ed.). Houghton Mifflin. ISBN 978-0-395-98272-3.
- Tinkle, D.W.; Dunham, A.E.; Congdon, J.T. (1993). "Life History and Demographic Variation in the Lizard Sceloporus graciosus: A Long-Term Study". Ecology. 74 (8): 2413–2429. Bibcode:1993Ecol...74.2413T. doi:10.2307/1939592. JSTOR 1939592.
