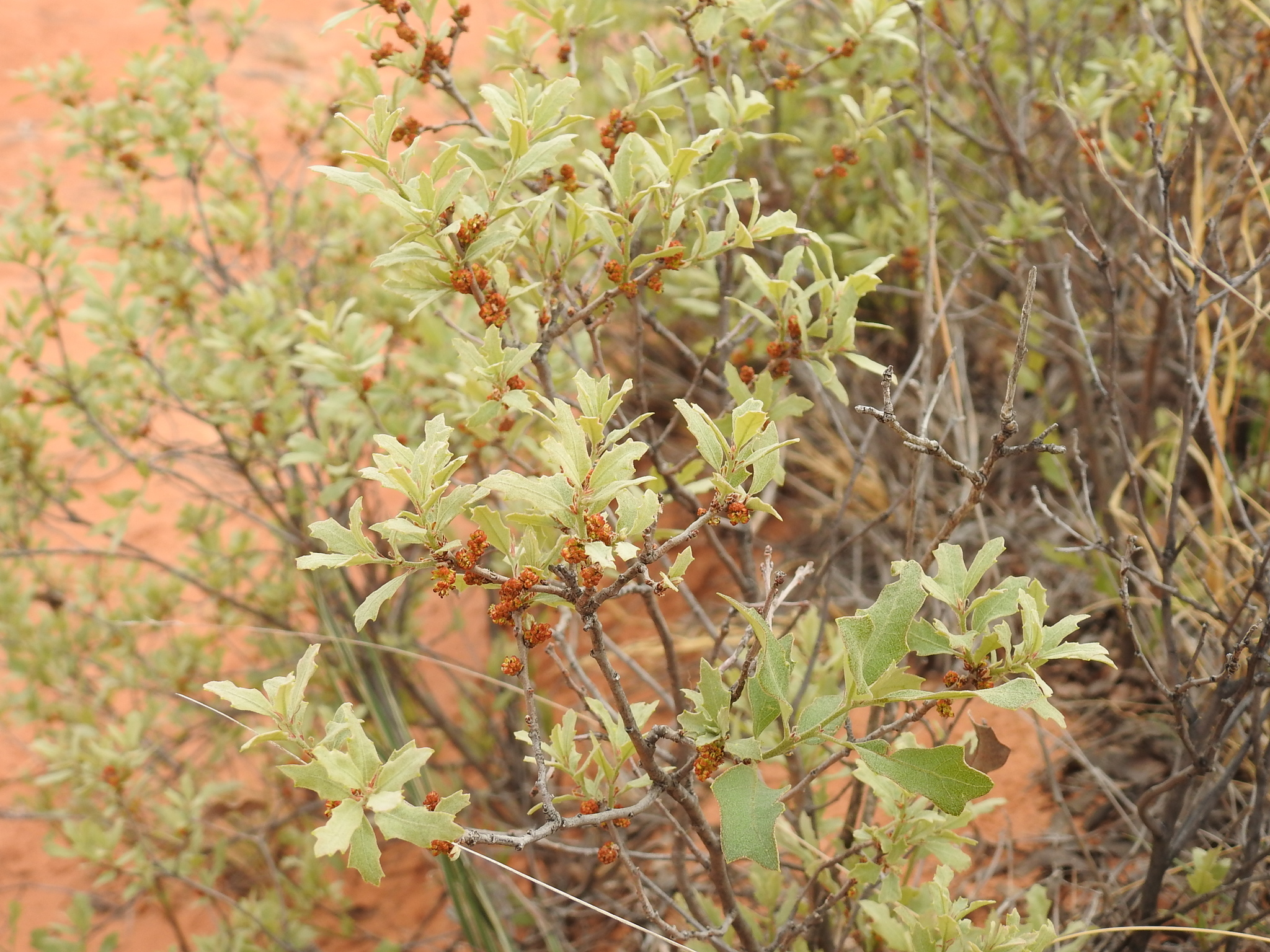

Conservation status
- Endangered (IUCN 3.1)

Scientific classification
- Kingdom: Plantae
- Clade: Embryophytes
- Clade: Tracheophytes
- Clade: Spermatophytes
- Clade: Angiosperms
- Clade: Eudicots
- Clade: Rosids
- Order: Fagales
- Family: Fagaceae
- Genus: Quercus
- Subgenus: Quercus subg. Quercus
- Section: Quercus sect. Quercus
- Species: Q. havardii

Binomial name
- Quercus havardii Rydberg
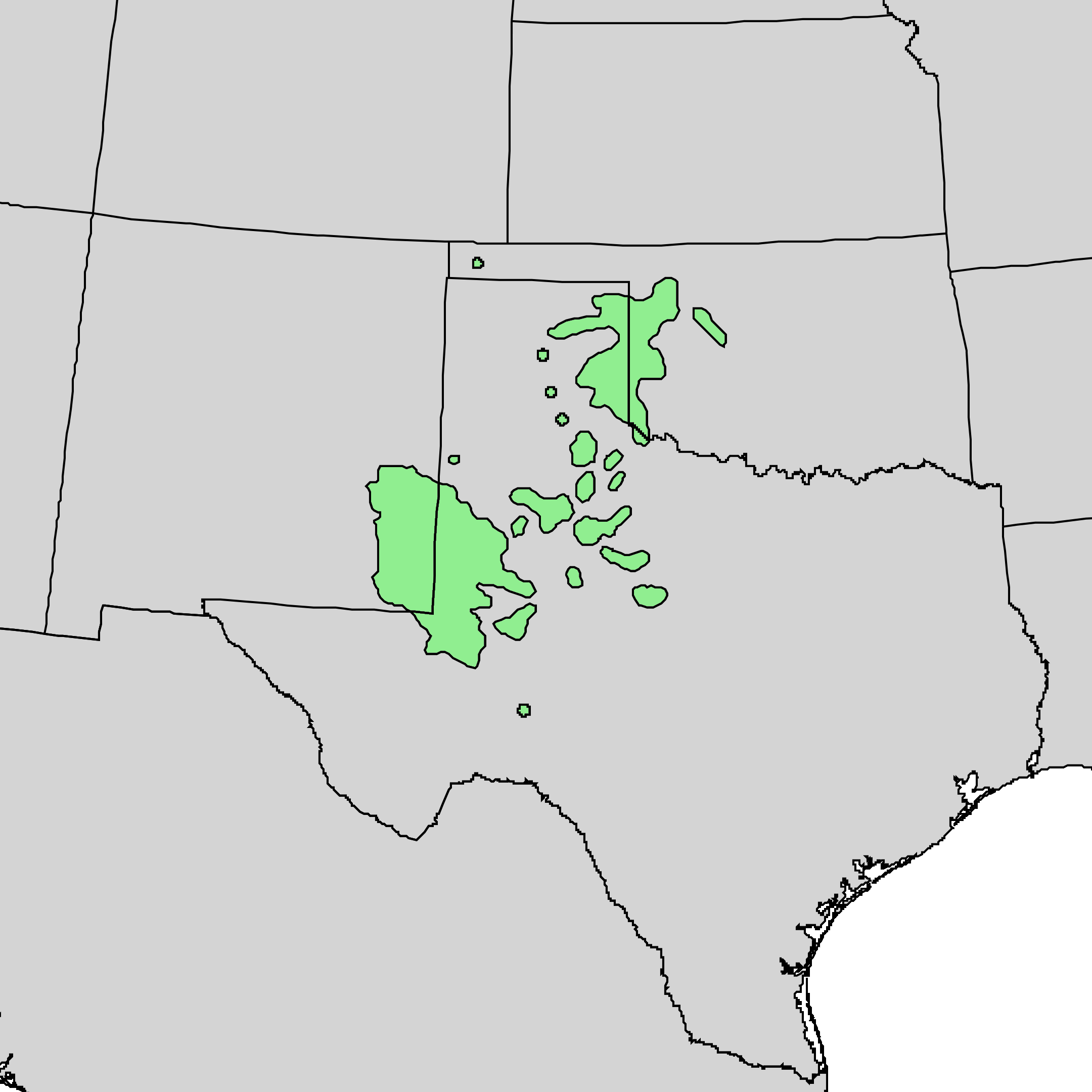
- Natural range of Quercus havardii in 1976

= Quercus havardii =

Shinnery oak

Species of oak tree

Quercus havardii (common names include shinnery oak, shin oak and Havard oak) is a deciduous, low-growing, thicket-forming shrub that occupies some two million to three million hectares (7,700 to 11,600 square miles) in the southern Great Plains of North America. Clones may reach hundreds to thousands of years old, although aboveground stems typically live only 11 to 15 years. Shinnery oak stems are usually 1 to 2 metres (3 feet 3 inches to 6 feet 7 inches) tall and codominate the plant community with mid- and tall-grasses, which are usually taller than the oaks.

The specific epithet honors U.S. Army surgeon and botanist Valery Havard, who contributed much to the knowledge of southwestern plants. The word "shinnery" seems to be derived from chêne (French for oak), and not from the height of the plant.

== Description ==
Form: A low shrub to 2 metres (6 1/2 feet) or occasionally a small tree, Q. havardii forms large clonal thickets by extending rhizomes through the sandy soil where it is usually found. Rhizomes range from 3–15 centimetres (1 1/4–6 inches) in diameter and are concentrated in the upper 60 cm (24 in) of soil, although penetration depths of 9 m (30 ft) have been reported in shifting dunes. Lateral roots and woody rhizomes are widespread near the soil surface. At least 90% of shinnery oak's biomass is underground, and fortuitous root grafting is common. These underground stems commonly spread to form plants 3 to 15 m (10 to 49 ft) or more in diameter. Single clones are reported to cover up to 81 hectares (200 acres) and to achieve ages over 13,000 years.

Flowers: Shinnery oak is monoecious with both female and male flowers borne separately on the same plant. Male catkins are densely flowered, 1.5–3.8 cm long, and hang downward. Female catkins are 3–7 millimetres (1/8–1/4 in) long, contain 1 to 5 flowers, and are usually axillary on young shoots. Shinnery oaks are wind pollinated, and flowering occurs in the spring.

Acorns: Acorns develop in one year, maturing in the autumn. Acorns occur alone or in clusters of 2 or 3, and are 12–25 mm (1/2–1 in) long by 14–18 mm wide. A scaly cup covers about 1/3 to 1/2 of the nut. On average, acorn crops are produced in 3 out of 10 years.

Foliage: The leathery, highly variable leaves are grey green to olive green, have a lustrous upper surface, and are whitish and densely hairy below. The leaves are alternate, simple, with variable shape (oblong, ovate, or elliptical), and with wavy or shallowly lobed margins. Their length is 2 to 8 cm (3/4 to 3 1/8 in) and width 2 to 4 cm.

Twigs: Twigs are brown or grayish, 1–2.5 mm diameter, glabrous or densely covered with short grayish or yellowish hairs, that are lost with age. The buds are dark red-brown, somewhat spherical, about 2 mm long, and sparsely pubescent.

Bark: Bark on the larger stems is light gray and scaly.

== Taxonomy ==
Shinnery oak populations in Utah and Arizona are considered a variety of shinnery oak (Quercus havardii var. tuckeri) by some taxonomists. However, introgression of shinnery oak with Gambel oak (Quercus gambelii) and perhaps shrub live oak (Quercus turbinella) make taxonomic identification of these populations difficult.

Shinnery oak hybridizes with Mohr oak (Quercus mohriana) and post oak (Quercus stellata). Post oak × shinnery oak hybrids are likely to be a result of post oak's historic range, which extended more westerly than it does today. Mohr oak × shinnery oak hybrids are restricted to habitats intermediate to those occupied by the two species. Mohr oak inhabits limestone soils, and shinnery oak occurs on deep sand soils.

== Native range ==
Shinnery oak is native to western Oklahoma, west Texas, eastern New Mexico, and two isolated populations in southwest Kansas. A variety also occurs in northeastern Arizona and southeastern Utah. Sandy plains, sand dunes, and sand hills of the southern Great Plains are typical habitat.

== Management ==
A majority of shinnery oak occurs on private land used for agriculture and/or livestock production. It is considered undesirable on grazing lands, because it competes with better livestock forage and its buds and leaves are toxic to cattle for several weeks in spring. In addition, where cotton is grown near shinnery oak, boll weevils overwinter in the oak litter and infest nearby cotton fields in spring. Thus, most research and other human effort concerning shinnery oak have been devoted to its eradication.

The use of chemical and mechanical control methods has been extensive, making it likely that shinnery oak's distribution is decreasing. Most authorities do not recommend complete eradication of shinnery oak, indicating that forage production is typically greater if some shinnery oak remains in the community. Stocking rates and rotational grazing patterns exist that reduce the incidence of shinnery oak poisoning of cattle. Excessive control of shinnery oak is controversial because it can open sandy soils to wind erosion and can conflict with wildlife-habitat quality.

Shinnery oak sprouts prolifically from rhizomes soon after fire. Researchers described the communities as "extremely fire hardy".

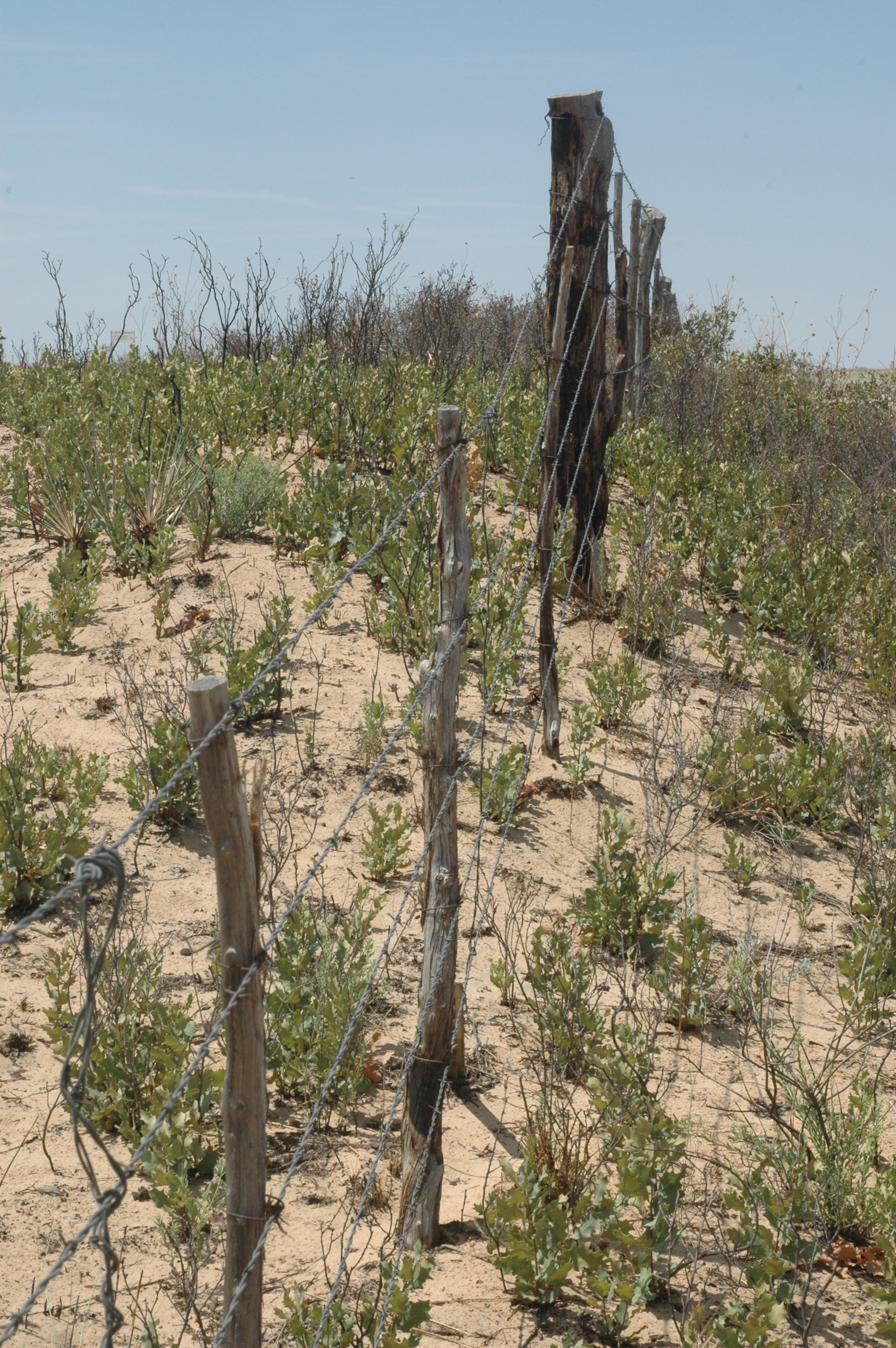
Quercus havardii resprouting

== Uses ==
Because shinnery oak thrives in a harsh environment, it functions as a sand dune stabilizer, protecting sandy soils from wind erosion. It also provides diverse wildlife species cover and food. Collared peccaries, lesser prairie-chickens, northern bobwhites, and many other wildlife species eat shinnery oak acorns. Deer, pronghorn, and southern plains woodrats browse shinnery oak. Shinnery oak habitats are used by black-tailed jackrabbits, desert cottontails, eastern cottontails, wild turkeys, western box turtles, a diversity of arthropods, approximately 25 snake species, and approximately 10 lizard species, including the endangered sand dune lizard (Sceloporus arenicolus).

Many game species also rely on shinnery oak. Scaled quail and northern bobwhites use shinnery oak habitats extensively, and shinnery oak habitats are considered "the principal home for white-tailed deer in the southern Great Plains".

Shinnery oak provides rich habitat for wildlife compared with the surrounding shortgrass plains. Maintaining wildlife habitat and improving vegetation for livestock grazing are often in conflict, and should be carefully considered before undertaking control of shinnery oak.
