= Soil moisture zone =

Depth of soil from which plant roots extract water

The soil moisture zone is the depth of soil from which plant roots extract water.
