= Species homogeneity =

Concept in ecology

In ecology, species homogeneity is a lack of biodiversity. Species richness is the fundamental unit in which to assess the homogeneity of an environment. Therefore, any reduction in species richness, especially endemic species, could be argued as advocating the production of a homogeneous environment.

== Monocultures ==
Homogeneity in agriculture and forestry; in particular, industrial agriculture and forestry use a limited number of species. About 7,000 plants (2.6% of all plant species) have been collected or cultivated for human consumption. Of these, a mere 200 have been domesticated and only a dozen contribute about 75% of the global intake of plant-derived calories.

95% of world consumption of protein derives from a few domesticated species, i.e. poultry, cattle and pigs. There are about 1,000 commercial fish species, but in aquaculture fewer than 10 species dominate global production. Human food production therefore rests on the tips of pyramids of biodiversity, leaving the majority of species not utilised and not domesticated.

== Species migration ==
Species naturally migrate and expand their ranges, utilising new habitats and resources, e.g. the cattle egret. These natural invasions, an incursion in the absence of anthropogenic influences, occur "when an intervening barrier is removed, or through the development of biotic or abiotic transportation mechanisms, able to overcome the barrier in question". Introductions, or human-mediated invasions, have in the last century become more frequent. It is estimated that on an average day more than 3,000 species alone are in transit aboard ocean-going vessels.

Using species richness as the unit for which to assess global homogeneity, it appears that anthropogenic assistance in alien species establishment has done much to reduce the number of endemic species, especially on remote islands. Some 'species-poor' habitats may, however, benefit in diversity if an invader can occupy an empty niche. Arguably, that environment becomes more diverse, equally it has also "become more similar to the rest of the world", though ecological interactions between the invaders and the natives are likely to be unique. Indeed, many species are so well naturalised that they are considered native, yet they were originally introduced; with the best examples probably being the Roman and Norman introductions of the hare and the rabbit respectively to Britain.

Introduction of non-endemic species and subsequent eradication of species can happen remarkably fast; evolutionary tempo is, however, slow and "succession of rapid change [will] result in a great impoverishment". That impoverishment will indeed equate in a world that is more similar, as there will simply be less species to formulate difference.

== See also ==
- Degeneracy
- Habitat destruction
- Habitat fragmentation
- Introduced species
- Over-exploitation
- Species gradients
