= Conkling Cavern =

Paleontological and archaeological site in New Mexico, US

Coordinates: 32°11′24″N 106°35′07″W

Conkling Cavern is a paleontological and archaeological site located in Doña Ana County, New Mexico, United States. It is part of the Organ Mountains-Desert Peaks National Monument. It was excavated in the late 1920s under the direction of Chester Stock. Unfortunately, Stock never published the fossil fauna from the excavations. Instead, R. P. Conkling, who had drawn scientific attention to the site, published very preliminary lists of mammals identified by Stock and birds identified by Howard. Several authors have done research on portions of the recovered fossil fauna. Excavated before modern dating techniques were developed, little is known about the chronology except some apparently is Holocene and much is Pleistocene in age.

The site is located on the east side of Bishop's Cap, an outlier of the Organ Mountains. The entrance to the cavern is essentially vertical. The cave was described by Conkling as having been filled originally to 8 feet below the entrance. A vertical section of the cave is pictured in the Conkling paper from a photograph of an exhibit that had been displayed at the Natural History Museum of Los Angeles County.

The Conkling Cavern material was deposited at that museum. Some additional material has since been recovered from spoil from the original excavations and is housed in the Paleobiology Collection, UTEP Biodiversity Collections, Department of Biological Sciences, and Centennial Museum and Chihuahuan Desert Gardens, University of Texas at El Paso. The faunal list includes identifications from all known collections.

Fragments of two humans were recovered, including parts of two skulls. One of these was at a depth of about 12 feet and the other at about 26 feet, about 26 inches beneath a layer of consolidated sandstone. The upper skull part was close to the ungual phalanges of a sloth. Gnawed human bones were found deeper in what was thought to be a dire wolf den.

Names have been changed to the current nomenclature. Keep in mind that identifications are tentative and some may be Holocene rather than Pleistocene.

== Fauna ==
Reptilia

- Tortoise
- Snake

Aves

- Branta canadensis
- Cathartes aura
- †Coragyps occidentalis
- Gymnogyps californianus
- Buteo jamaicensis
- Buteo swainsoni
- Haliaeetus leucocephalus
- Aquila chrysaetos
- Caracara cheriway prelutosus
- Falco sparverius
- Centrocercus urophasianus
- Callipepla ? gambeli
- Meleagris gallopavo
- †Geococcyx californianus conklingi
- Tyto furcata
- Speotyto cunicularia
- Asio otus
- Colaptes auratus
- Eremophila alpestris
- Corvus corax
- Gymnorhynus cyanocephalus
- Turdus migratorius
- Sialia sp.
- Agelaius ? phoeniceus
- Carpodacus mexicanus
- Pipilo erythrophthalmus

Mammalia

- Homo sapiens
- ? †Mylodon sp.
- ? †Megalonyx sp.
- †Nothrotheriops sp.
- Lepus sp.
- Sylvilagus cf. audubonii
- Sylvilagus nuttallii/floridanus
- Spermophilus sp.
- Tamias cf. cinereicollis
- Cynomys cf. ludovicianus
- Dipodomys sp.
- Thomomys bottae
- Geomys sp.
- Microtus mogollonensis
- Peromyscus sp.
- †Aenocyon dirus
- Canis latrans
- Vulpes velox
- Urocyon sp.
- Bassariscus sp.
- †Arctodus
- Mustela sp.
- Spilogale sp.
- Mephitis mephitis
- Taxidea sp.
- Puma concolor
- Lynx cf rufus
- †Equus sp.
- †Hemiauchenia sp.
- †Camelops hesternus
- Antilocapra sp.
- †Stockoceros sp. [as †Tetrameryx]
- †Capromeryx sp.
- Bison sp.

== Web Reference ==
- Conkling Cavern
