= Shelter Cave =

Archæological and paleontological site in New Mexico, United States

Shelter Cave is an archaeological and paleontological site located in Doña Ana County, New Mexico.

== Description ==
The site is a rock shelter well up on the western side of Bishop's Cap, an outlier of the Organ Mountains, within the Organ Mountains-Desert Peaks National Monument in New Mexico, United States. It lies about 450 ft below the summit according to Brattstrom (1964); this would make its elevation about 1,500 metres (5,000 ft). It was originally excavated by the Los Angeles County Museum (LACM) c. 1929 (LACMVP site number 1010). Specimens collected from talus, fill, or other areas are labeled 1010 Dump or 1010D. Specimens collected by Conkling are labeled C 1010. The shelter was excavated in 5-foot sections.

Brattstrom (1964) had access to the original field notes. Two profiles were given. One in Sec. S-5-7, from bottom to top: rock bottom of the shelter, 5" angular fragments, 8" smooth concretionary limestone fragments mixed with brown dust, 6" of ash mixed with angular fragments, 10" of layered gray (volcanic?) ash grading into a layer of brown, 4" of hard burned guano, 4" of unconsolidated bat guano, top. Most bones were found in brown and gray ash. Another section 53" thick, from bottom up: floor of the shelter, 17" of broken concretionary limestone fragments, 16" of brown ash, 12" of gray layered ash grading into the brown below it, 8" of bat guano, top.

Brattstrom (1964:95) gives several quotes from the original field notes: Sloth in place, S-5-4 in upper guano layer and in direct association with bits of knots of vegetative material. S-6-5, sloth bone in upper yellow layer. Mummified rat and snake on top of rocks in bat guano. S-5-6, S-5-5, horse jaws in brown ash. S-5-6, sloth skull fragment in gray ash below overhanging rock. In same section above rock was an Indian grindstone. S-4-7, beads and sandal found beneath guano layer and also below overhanging rock. S-4-9, badger and deer skulls in gray ash.

== Age ==
Rancholabrean (late Pleistocene) and Holocene. One date on sloth dung (Van Devender and Spaulding 1979) of 11,330 ± 370 BP (Before Present). Material has continued to accumulate up to the present. Thompson et al. (1980) list three dates for sloth dung, including that above; the others are 12,330 ± 190 and 12,430 ± 250. They also list dates on desert tortoise (Gopherus agassizii) scutes and bone (11,280 to 12,520) and dates for middens of packrats in the shelter (11,850 to 31,250).

== Comments ==
Fosberg (1936) lists plants identified from Shelter Cave deposits, but without provenance data; they likely are Holocene. He also mentions that there are coprolites of either sloth or horse. Thompson et al. (1980) point out that vegetation from pre-full-glacial middens from the shelter are more mesic than the terminal Pleistocene ones that lack oak, and pinyon pine is rare.

This is the type locality of Stockoceros conklingi (Conkling's pronghorn).

The faunal list includes one or more citations for each taxon. UTEP indicates specimens are deposited in the Resource Collections of the Laboratory for Environmental Biology, Centennial Museum and Chihuahuan Desert Gardens, University of Texas at El Paso.

The Los Angeles County Museum has a large collection from Shelter Cave, including the type of Stockoceros conklingi. Most of the material has yet to be studied.

== Fauna ==
AMPHIBIA

- Scaphiopus cf. couchii Brattstrom 1964
- Rana cf. pipiens Brattstrom 1964

REPTILIA

- Gopherus agassizii Brattstrom 1961, 1964; Van Devender et al. 1976; UTEP
- Eumeces obsoletus Brattstrom 1964
- Phrynosoma cornutum Brattstrom 1964
- Crotaphytus collaris Brattstrom 1964
- Coluber constrictor Brattstrom 1964
- Masticophis flagellum Brattstrom 1964
- Lampropeltis getula Brattstrom 1964
- Pituophis melanoleucus Brattstrom 1964
- Elaphe subocularis Brattstrom 1964
- Trimorphodon biscutatus UTEP
- Crotalus atrox Brattstrom 1964

AVES

- Anser ? albifrons Howard and Miller 1933
- Anas acuta Howard and Miller 1933
- Anas crecca Howard and Miller 1933
- Cathartes aura Howard and Miller 1933
- Breagyps clarki Howard 1971 (Specimen reported as Gymnogyps californianus by Howard and Miller 1933)
- Accipiter striatus Howard and Miller 1933
- Buteo jamaicensis Howard and Miller 1933
- Buteo swainsoni Howard and Miller 1933
- Buteo ? albonotatus Howard and Miller 1933
- Buteogallus fragilis Howard and Miller 1933
- Aquila chrysaetos Howard and Miller 1933
- Polyborus plancus prelutosus Howard and Miller 1933
- Falco peregrinus Howard and Miller 1933
- Falco sparverius Howard and Miller 1933
- Centrocercus urophasianus Howard and Miller 1933
- Meleagris crassipes Rea 1980
- Callipepla squamata Howard and Miller 1933
- Lophortyx sp. Howard and Miller 1933
- Oreortyx pictus Harris 1985; Howard and Miller 1933
- Porzana carolina Howard and Miller 1933
- Fulica americana Howard and Miller 1933
- Larus sp. Howard and Miller 1933
- Zenaida macroura Howard and Miller 1933
- Geococcyx californianus conklingi Harris and Crews 1983; Howard and Miller 1933
- Geococcyx californianus californianus Harris 1985; Howard and Miller 1933
- Tyto furcata Howard and Miller 1933
- Otus asio Howard and Miller 1933
- Bubo virginianus Howard and Miller 1933
- Athene cunicularia Howard and Miller 1933
- Aegolius funereus Howard and Miller 1933
- Aegolius acadicus Howard and Miller 1933
- Aeronautes saxatalis Howard and Miller 1933
- Colaptes auratus Howard and Miller 1933
- Melanerpes formicivorus Howard and Miller 1933
- Sayornis saya Howard and Miller 1933
- Eremophila alpestris Howard and Miller 1933
- Pica pica Howard and Miller 1933
- Corvus corax Howard and Miller 1933
- Gymnorhinus cyanocephalus Howard and Miller 1933
- Catherpes mexicanus Howard and Miller 1933
- Salpinctes obsoletus Howard and Miller 1933
- Turdus migratorius Howard and Miller 1933
- Sialia sp. Howard and Miller 1933
- Toxostoma sp. Howard and Miller 1933
- Oreoscoptes montanus Howard and Miller 1933
- Lanius ludovicianus Howard and Miller 1933
- Molothrus ater Howard and Miller 1933
- Pyelorhamphus molothroides Howard and Miller 1933
- Carpodacus mexicanus Howard and Miller 1933
- Pipilo erythrophthalmus Howard and Miller 1933
- Pipilo fuscus Howard and Miller 1933
- Calamospiza melanocorys Howard and Miller 1933
- Amphispiza bilineata — very recently entombed according to Howard and Miller 1933.

MAMMALIA

- Notiosorex crawfordi Harris 1985
- Nothrotheriops shastensis Harris 1985
- Lepus californicus UTEP
- ? Geomyidae Harris 1985
- Neotoma cinerea Harris 1985; UTEP
- Microtus cf. montanus Smartt 1977; UTEP
- Canis latrans Harris 1985
- Urocyon/Vulpes Harris 1985
- Taxidea taxus Harris 1985
- Spilogale sp. Harris 1985 as Spilogale putorius
- Mephitis mephitis Harris 1985
- Lynx rufus Harris 1985
- Equus sp. (large) Harris 1985
- Equus sp. (small) Harris 1985; UTEP
- Camelops sp. Stock 1932a
- Odocoileus sp. Harris 1985
- Stockoceros conklingi Stock 1930
- Capromeryx sp. Harris 1985
- Ovis canadensis Harris 1985
