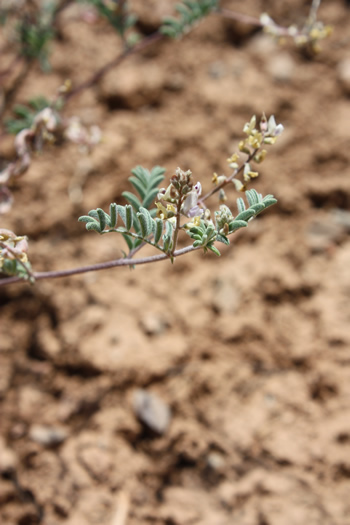

Conservation status
- Critically Imperiled (NatureServe)

Scientific classification
- Kingdom: Plantae
- Clade: Embryophytes
- Clade: Tracheophytes
- Clade: Angiosperms
- Clade: Eudicots
- Clade: Rosids
- Order: Fabales
- Family: Fabaceae
- Subfamily: Faboideae
- Genus: Astragalus
- Species: A. microcymbus

Binomial name
- Astragalus microcymbus Barneby

= Astragalus microcymbus =

Species of legume

Astragalus microcymbus is a species of flowering plant in the legume family known by the common name skiff milkvetch. It is endemic to Colorado in the United States, where it is known from Gunnison County and the edge of Saguache County. It was discovered in 1945 by Rupert Barneby, a British botanist. Currently, skiff milkvetch is experiencing population declines and is listed as a Tier 1 species in the Rare Plant Addendum to the Colorado State Wildlife Action Plan.

== Description ==
The skiff milkvetch is a perennial herb native to Colorado. It has a lifespan ranging from 1–14 years with most individuals living for 2 to 3 years. Skiff milkvetch belongs to the Astragalus genus, the largest genus in the legume family, containing over 3,000 plant species. This genus is characterized by pinnately compound leaves and flowers growing in clusters referred to as racemes. The skiff milkvetch has loosely packed racemes, containing 7-14 flowers. Flowers are pale-purple to off white, blooming from May to early July. The upper petal is notched and the lower petals have a purple tip. Leaves are 2–4 cm long with individual leaflets 3–9 mm long. The common name "skiff" refers to the boat-shaped fruits produced by the plant. Fruits are produced from late May through July, growing up to 8 mm long. It is able to produce seeds in the first year of establishment and can continue reproduction for ten years, however, it is able to go dormant for multiple years at a time. It is unknown if the plant is reliant on pollinators for reproduction, although findings suggest pollinators may play some role in seed production. Seed dispersal is likely done via wind and rain, however this is not well researched. Skiff milkvetch has been observed using a mast seeding strategy, where whole populations produce excess seeds during some years and minimal seeds during other years. Skiff milkvetch stems exhibit a slight purple tinge and grow 2.5–6 centimetres (0.98–2.36 in) long between nodules, with the full plant growing up to 30 centimetres (12 in) tall; however, stems often grow along the ground or wrapped in other nearby vegetation.

== Habitat ==
=== Range ===
The skiff milkvetch occupies a very small range within Gunnison County and likely into the northwestern edge of Saguache county within Southwestern Colorado. Historically, estimates have been up to 20,500 individual plants in five distinct populations. It is found in a 3.5-by-10-mile (5.6 km × 16.1 km) area with a disconnected population 10.5 miles (16.9 km) to the southwest. These ranges occupy two distinct drainages: the South Beaver Creek drainage and the Cebolla Creek drainage, with elevation ranging from 2400 to 2500m. These areas are land managed by the BLM (Bureau of Land Management) and private land owners. Skiff milkvetch live primarily on gravelly sandy loam soils that are well drained. Occasionally, they be found growing on rock outcroppings, loose stones, and shallow soils within sagebrush. This region is relatively cold and dry, receiving about 20 inches (510 mm) of precipitation annually and having an average temperature of 39.1 °F (3.9 °C).

=== Ecology ===
Skiff milkvetch lives in the sagebrush steppe in the Mountain-Prairie region of the United States. This region occupies the interior of the continent west of the Rocky Mountains. It is characterized by the dominant vegetation type, sagebrush (Artemisia spp.). Living among the sagebrush are a variety of bird species, small mammals, predatory animals, and grazers. Most notably, there is the Gunnison sage-grouse, rabbit, coyote, and pronghorn. There are also a variety of herbaceous plants living in the understory of the sagebrush such as; native bromes, cacti, and other wildflowers with bitterbrush and rabbitbrush bushes. The skiff milkvetch provides a food source for small mammals that feed on the above ground vegetative structures of the plant.

== Threats ==
Skiff milkvetch populations have been declining due to a variety of threats. Habitat loss is likely a source for declining populations. There has been an increase in urban development in Gunnison County near the habitat of skiff milkvetch. This habitat is only 2 to 7 miles (3.2 to 11.3 km) from the city of Gunnison, the largest in all of Gunnison County. Along with many towns in the Rocky Mountains, Gunnison is experiencing rapid population growth. Increased human populations are directly correlated to increasing habitat fragmentation through the building of infrastructure and increased recreation. Much of the range of skiff milkvetch lies within the popular recreation area of Hartman Rocks. This area is heavily used by off-highway vehicles (OHV) and mountain bikes. A quarter of skiff milkvetch populations are on privately owned land with development on it. In addition to habitat loss, nonnative invasive plants are a source for population decreases in skiff milkvetch. Among the invasive plants impacting skiff milkvetch populations is cheatgrass. Over the course of the past century cheatgrass has becoming a dominant force in shaping sagebrush ecosystems. It has experienced population increases due to shifting wildfire activity, agriculture, and livestock use in the sagebrush ecosystem. Due to cheatgrass' extreme ability to reproduce it heavily alters ecosystems and out competes native vegetation. Deer, elk, and livestock use the same habitat occupied by skiff milkvetch. These large grazers will eat the plant further reducing populations and may also trample on plants, killing them. There is long standing research on the negative impacts of livestock on native vegetation in arid western ecosystems. These effects can likely be applied to our understanding of skiff milkvetch, although they have not been explicitly researched.

Skiff milkvetch has long been subject to herbivory by small mammals. One study found that 26% of all skiff milkvetch plants had damage from herbivores. Another suggested that after two consecutive years of heavy predation a plant dies. This is most impactful in years with increased rabbit populations.

Finally, skiff milkvetch population decreases can be attributed to climate change. This plant is extremely sensitive to precipitation changes. During summer drought conditions the entire plant becomes dormant, halting all reproductive efforts. Current climate projections for the region favor drier, warmer summers. This increase in summer drought condition will result in a lack of reproduction and decreased recruitment of skiff milkvetch.

== Conservation efforts ==
In 2010, the skiff milkvetch was petitioned to be added to the list of endangered species protected by the U.S. government. However, it was ruled to be warranted but there are higher priority species that must be listed first, currently it listed as a candidate species. Since 1995 the Denver Botanic Gardens have been monitoring skiff milkvetch populations, collecting data used in a variety of studies. On going studies are focused on understanding the life history and reproductive methods of skiff milkvetch. One study is using data collected from 2019 and 2010 using 150 plants characterizing pollinator visits, seed bank effectivity, and herbivory. Another focused on environmental conditions impacts on skiff milkvetch reproduction as well as herbivore impacts on population dynamics. A different study has looked into population genetics of skiff milkvetch, furthering our understanding of the evolution and speciation of skiff milkvetch. The plant has also been listed by the BLM as a special status species, meaning all recreation, treatments, and restoration efforts in the range of skiff milkvetch must be done with the plant's best interest in mind.
