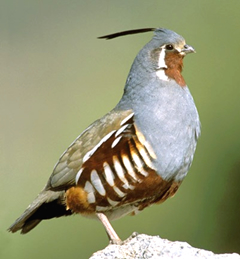
- Male

Conservation status
- Least Concern (IUCN 3.1)

- Secure (NatureServe)

Scientific classification
- Kingdom: Animalia
- Phylum: Chordata
- Class: Aves
- Order: Galliformes
- Family: Odontophoridae
- Genus: Oreortyx; Baird, 1858
- Species: O. pictus

Binomial name
- Oreortyx pictus (Douglas, 1829)

= Mountain quail =

Species of bird

The mountain quail (Oreortyx pictus) is a small ground-dwelling bird in the New World quail family. This species is the only one in the genus Oreortyx, which is sometimes included in Callipepla. This is not appropriate, however, as the mountain quail's ancestors diverged from other New World quails earlier than the bobwhites, no later than 6 mya.

== Description ==
The bird's average length is 26–28 cm (10–11 in), with a wingspan of 35–40 cm (14–16 in). They have relatively short, rounded wings and long, featherless legs. These birds are easily recognized by their topknots, which are shorter in the female and change color with the seasons and geographic location of particular populations. They have a brown face, gray breast, brown back and primaries, and heavily white barred underside. Females display greater brown coloring on their dorsal side, a paler red on their undersides, and wider white barring on the flank than their male counterparts. Mountain quails lose the multi-color primary coverts on their wings as they age, and by 15 months old will only have solid-colored coverts.

== Subspecies ==
There are five recognized subspecies:

Image	Subspecies	Distribution
	O. p. pictus – (Douglas, 1829)	nominate, found in the Cascade Range of Washington to coastal mountains of central California
	O. p. plumifer – (Gould, 1837)	Southern Washington to western Nevada and central California
	O. p. russelli – AH Miller, 1946: pallid mountain quail	Little San Bernardino Mountains of southern California
	O. p. eremophilus – van Rossem, 1937: desert mountain quail	Sierra Nevada of southern California to northern Baja, and extreme southwestern Nevada
	O. p. confinis – Anthony, 1889: southern mountain quail	mountains of northern Baja California

== Distribution and habitat ==
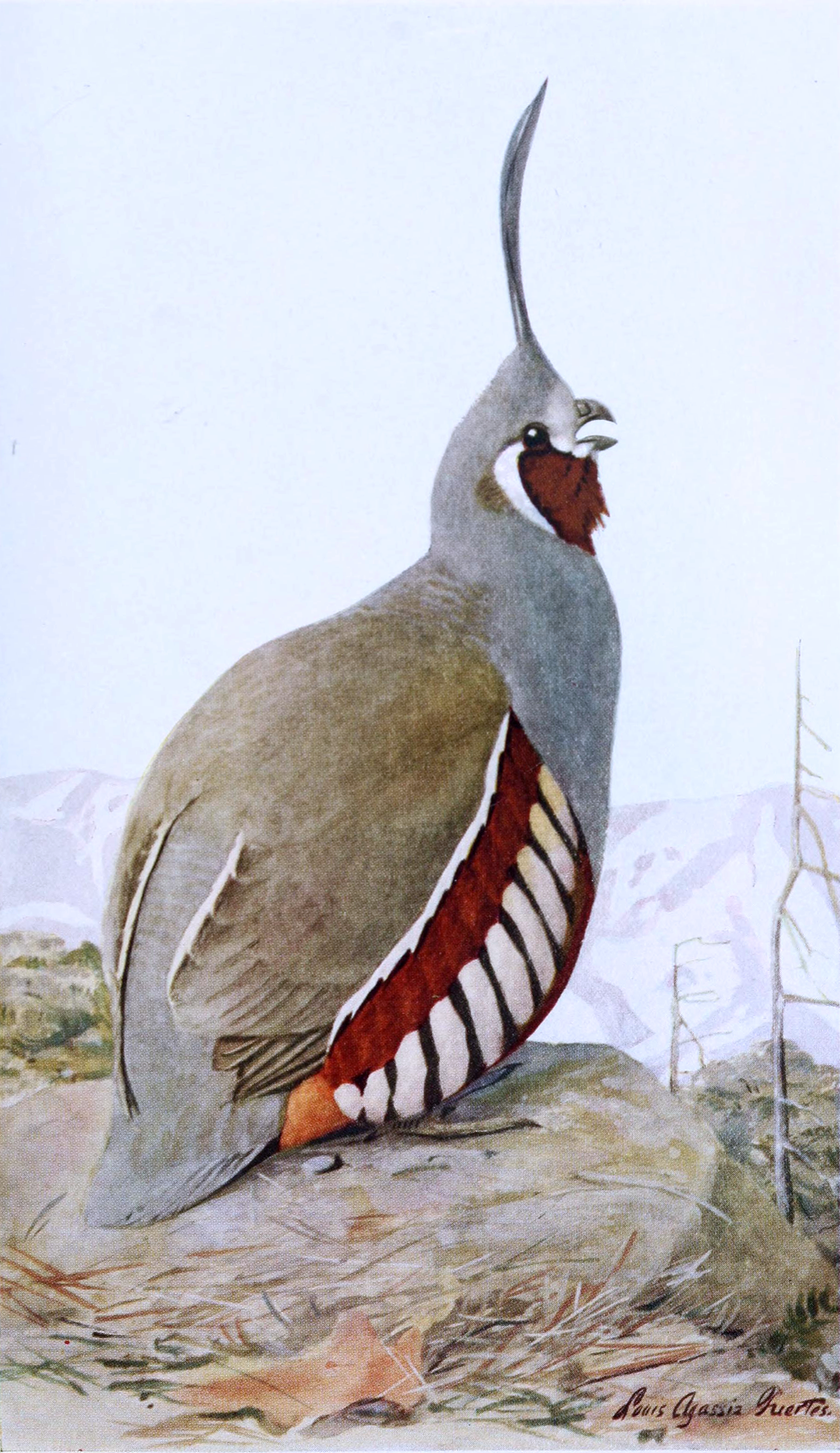
Oreortyx pictus

It inhabits mountainous chaparral west of the Rocky Mountains, from British Columbia in Canada, and some areas of Washington state in the United States, to Baja Peninsula, Mexico. It can be found up to 3,000 m (9,800 ft) above sea level. It is a non-migratory species; however some populations may be altitudinal migrants in some mountain ranges. Mountain quails also inhabit lava reefs in the Modoc Plateau of California, in addition to the chaparral and wooded areas of the Sierra Nevada Mountains and Coast Range.

== Behavior ==
Mountain quail primarily move about by walking, and can move surprisingly quickly through brush and undergrowth. In the late summer, fall and winter, the adults and immature young congregate into family groups of up to 20 birds. The birds' habits can be secretive. Any flight is usually short and explosive, with many rapid wingbeats followed by a slow glide to the ground.

=== Feeding ===
Its diet consists primarily of plant matter and seeds. The chicks are decidedly more insectivorous than adults, gradually consuming more plant matter as they mature.

=== Breeding ===
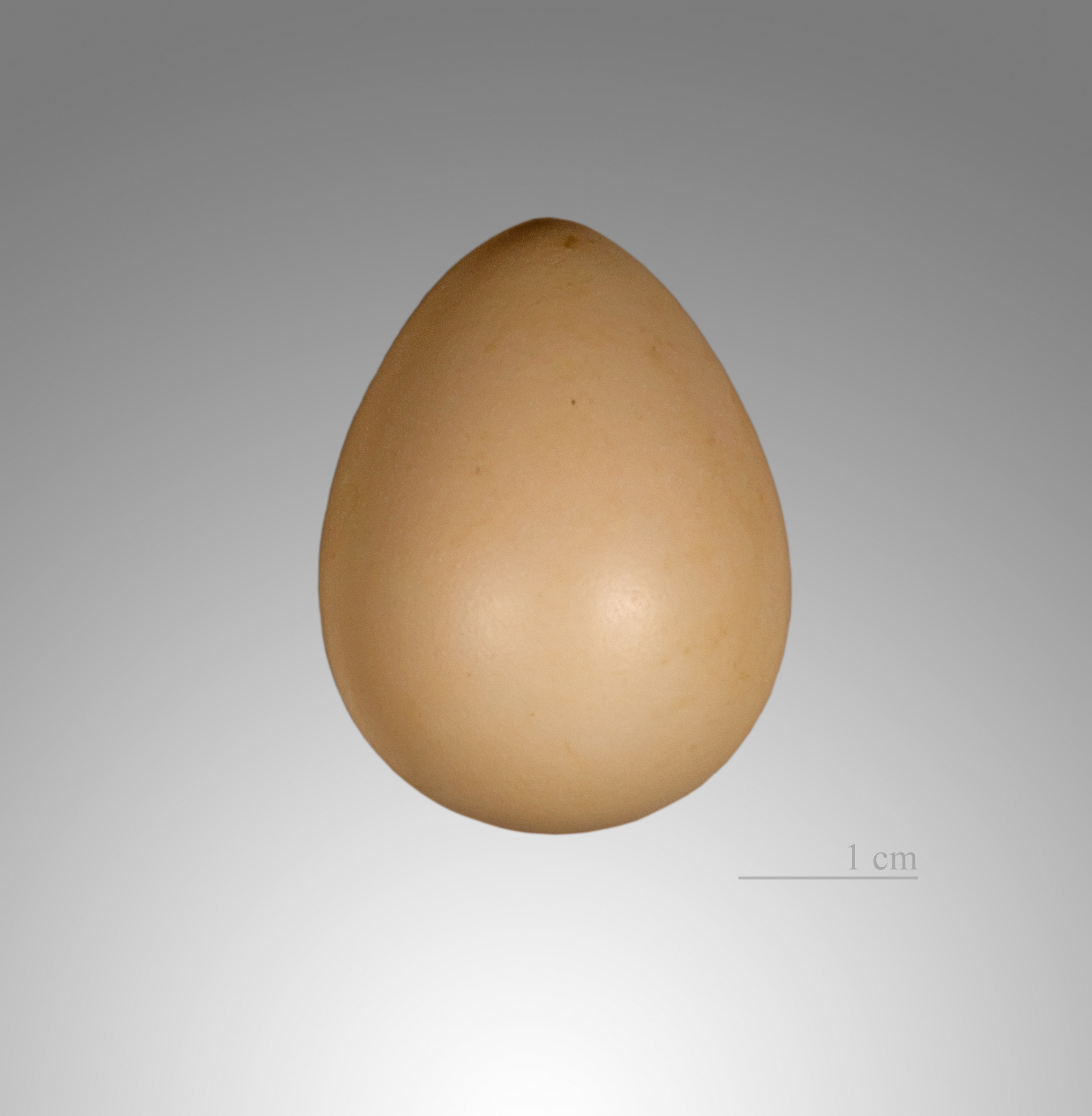
Egg of Oreortyx pictus – MHNT

Breeding among mountain quail is monogamous and rarely gregarious. The female typically lays 9–10 eggs in a simple scrape concealed in vegetation, often at the base of a tree or shrub, usually close to water. Eggs measure 3.22–3.7 cm (1.27–1.46 in) in length and 2.46–2.67 cm (0.97–1.05 in) in width. Incubation lasts from 21 to 25 days, usually performed by the female and rarely by the male. However, preliminary research by the University of Nevada suggests that males have successfully incubated chicks on their own, which creates the possibility of a pair of mountain quails raising two broods in one breeding season. The chicks are precocial, leaving the nest with their parents within hours of hatching.

== Status and conservation ==
It is not considered threatened by the IUCN, being plentiful across a wide range. However, its success is tied to sufficient habitat, which expands in cooler and more arid climate. Subfossil remains have been found, for example at Rocky Arroyo in the Guadalupe Mountains and Shelter Cave, New Mexico, where sufficient habitat no longer exists. The bones date found from the end of the last ice age to not much more than 8000 BC.

A petition to list the mountain quail as endangered or threatened was denied by the U.S. Fish and Wildlife Service in 2003. However, outside of California, the birds' habitat has been decreasing in Idaho, Nevada, and eastern Oregon and Washington because of drought and human activity, including agriculture and development. Man-made water developments (commonly referred to as "guzzlers") are one tool that can be used to bolster populations in areas where drought is a significant barrier to the species' success.
