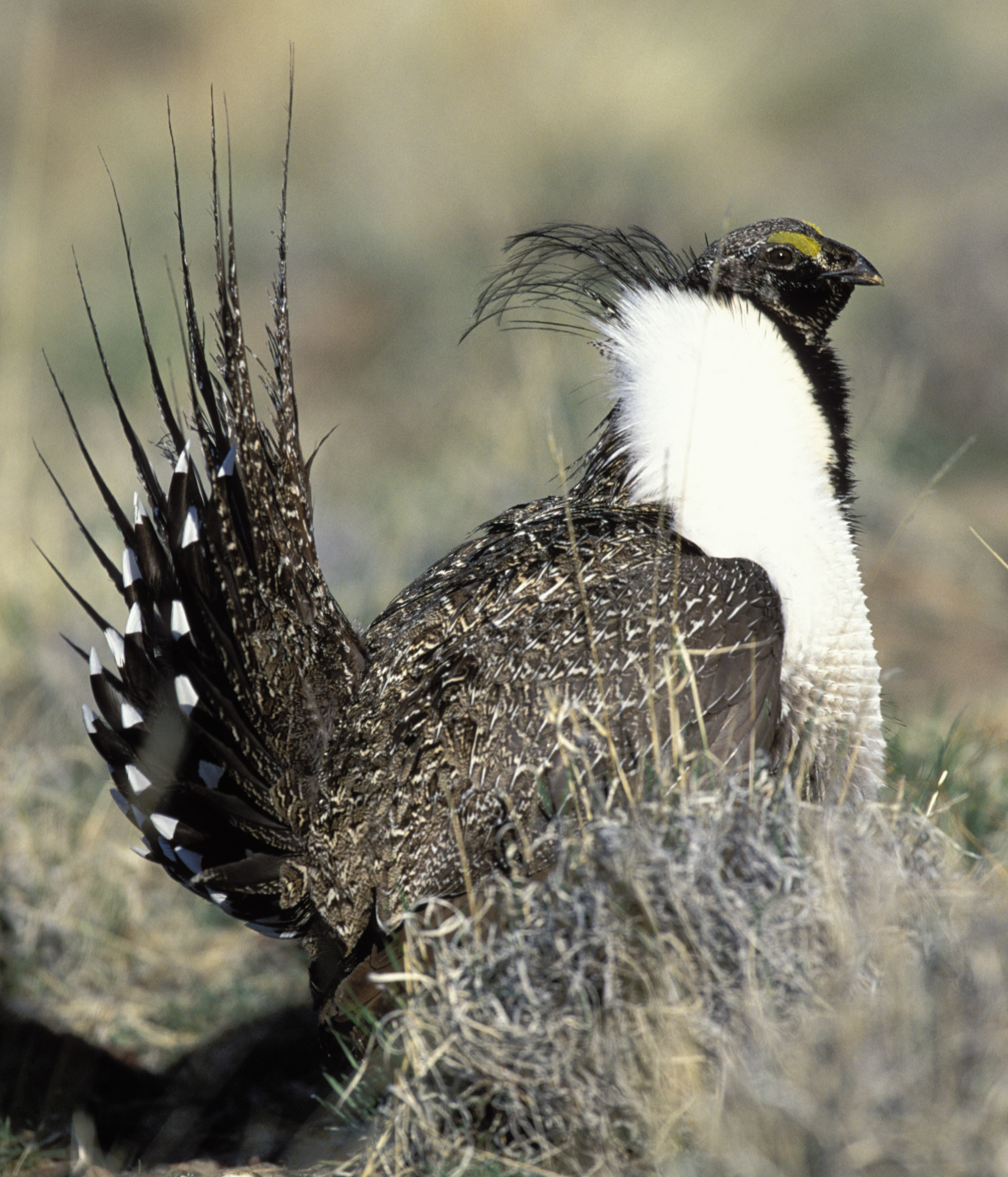
- Adult male greater sage-grouse

Scientific classification
- Kingdom: Animalia
- Phylum: Chordata
- Class: Aves
- Order: Galliformes
- Family: Phasianidae
- Tribe: Tetraonini
- Genus: Centrocercus; Swainson, 1832

Type species
- Tetrao urophasianus Bonaparte, 1827

Species
- Centrocercus minimus; Centrocercus urophasianus
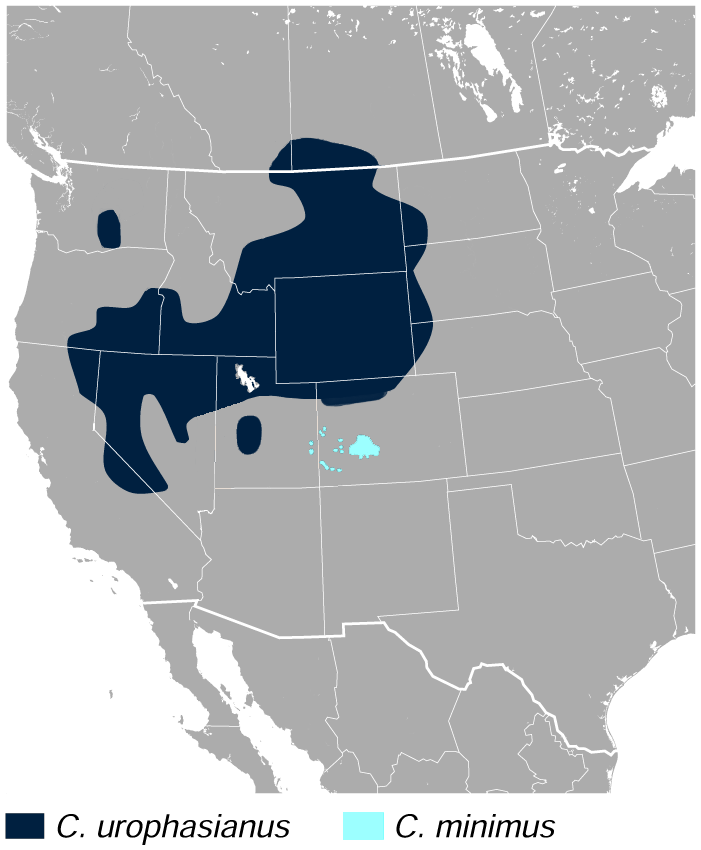
- Greater sage and Gunnison grouse ranges

= Centrocercus =

Sage-grouse

Genus of birds

Sage-grouse are grouse belonging to the bird genus Centrocercus. The genus includes two species: the Gunnison grouse (Centrocercus minimus) and the greater sage-grouse (Centrocercus urophasianus). These birds are distributed throughout large portions of the north-central and Western United States, as well as the Canadian provinces of Alberta and Saskatchewan. The International Union for Conservation of Nature classified the C. minimus species as endangered in 2020 and C. urophasianus as near threatened in 2016.

== Names ==
The specific epithet is from another Greek word, oura, plus phasianos, pheasant. The noun "pheasant" was originally applied to a bird that was native to the valley of the Phasis River (now the Rioni River), which is located in Georgia. In the time of Lewis and Clark, the word "pheasant" stood for "a genus of gallinaceous birds", according to lexicographer Noah Webster (1806), and the explorers often used it in that sense. "Gallinaceous" then referred to "domestic fowls, or the gallinae"; the family Galliformes (Latin "gallus", cock, and "forma", shape) now includes pheasants, grouse, turkeys, quail, and all domestic chickens.

Sage grouse are also collectively known as "sagehen", "sage grouse", "sage cock", "sage chicken", or "cock of the plains."

== History ==
Sage grouse have been widely recognized in Native American culture for some time. The animals were a part of pre-Columbian diets and were represented in certain traditional ceremonies, as well. Indeed, Sage Grouse previously inhabited most of what became the western United States, with ranges in 16 different states.

In their day, Lewis and Clark were credited with the discovery of five gallinaceous birds in addition to the sage grouse—the Columbian sharp-tailed grouse, the dusky grouse, Franklin's grouse, the Oregon ruffed grouse, and the mountain quail; they were the first to widely spread knowledge about these birds to European settlers.

=== US military issues ===
In September 2016, the National Defense Authorization Act (NDAA) stalled in Congress because Majority Leader Kevin McCarthy indicated he would not let the annual NDAA proceed to a vote in the House of Representatives unless it contained language to bar the sage grouse from the federal endangered species list until at least 2025. President Obama threatened a veto over the issue that the Senate Armed Services Committee Chairman John McCain believed would be sustained. US Air Force spending on sage grouse conservation is around US$200,000, with eight known military installations having confirmed grouse populations: Dugway Proving Ground and Tooele Army Depot in Utah; Sheridan Training Area and Camp Guernsey in Wyoming; Hawthorne Army Depot and Nellis Air Force Base in Nevada; Yakima Training Center in Washington, and Mountain Home Air Force Base in Idaho.

== Species ==
There are two species:

Genus Centrocercus – Swainson, 1832 – two species
Common name	Scientific name and subspecies	Range	Size and ecology	IUCN status and estimated population
Gunnison sage-grouse Male Female	Centrocercus minimus Young, Braun, C, Oyler-McCance, Hupp & Quinn, 2000	southwestern Colorado and extreme southeastern Utah	Size: Habitat: Diet:	EN
Greater sage-grouse Male Female	Centrocercus urophasianus (Bonaparte, 1827) Two subspecies: C. u. urophasianus; C. u. phaios	western United States and southern Alberta and Saskatchewan, Canada.	Size: Habitat: Diet:	VU

The Mono Basin population, usually included in the Greater sage-grouse, may represent a third species.

== Anatomical features ==
Males of C. urophasianus are the largest grouse from temperate North America, attaining a maximum weight of 3.2 kilograms (7 lb). Adults have a long, pointed tail and legs with feathers to the toes. As in most Galliformes, there is pronounced sexual dimorphism.

== Courtship and mating ==
Centrocercus species have elaborate courtship rituals. Each spring males congregate on leks and perform a "strutting display." The male puffs up a large, whitish air sack on its chest, makes a soft drumming noise, and struts around with his tail feathers displayed and air sack puffed up. Groups of females observe these displays and select the most attractive males to mate with. Only a few males do most of the breeding. Males perform on leks for several hours in the early morning and evening during the spring months between February and April. Leks are generally open areas adjacent to dense sagebrush stands, and the same lek may be used by grouse for decades.

=== Offspring ===
Hens build nests and lay and incubate their eggs under the cover of sagebrush. The hen uses grass and forbs between patches of sagebrush for additional cover. During incubation, female Sand Grouse undertake recesses, where they leave the nest to undertake self-maintenance activities, typically within 250 m of the nest.

Chicks can walk as soon as they are hatched and are able to fly short distances within two weeks. Within five weeks they are able to fly longer distances.

== Conservation status ==
Populations of sage grouse are in decline due to environment loss and decline of the pristine plains environments it requires to mate. The sage grouse is found in significant numbers within only half of the states comprising its original territories. The Biodiversity Conservation Alliance and other organizations have petitioned to list the grouse under the Endangered Species Act.

In March 2010 the U.S. Fish and Wildlife Service (USFWS) concluded that greater sage-grouse are warranted for protection as "threatened" under the U.S. federal Endangered Species Act (ESA). However the USFWS also concluded that immediate listing was "precluded" by higher listing priorities for other jeopardized species. Thus they designated the species a "Level 8 Candidate" for addition to the list of threatened species at some future date. Their finding is being litigated by groups contending the species should immediately receive protections under the ESA.

The Agricultural Research Service (ARS) of the United States Department of Agriculture (USDA) investigated some of the reasons for the declining sage-grouse population. Researchers observed cattle who share grazing land with the sage-grouse. They found that cattle, after consuming about 40% of the tussocks in between sagebrush bushes, will continue to consume the tussocks growing underneath the sagebrush, thereby destroying the nesting habitat for the sage-grouse. In order to preserve the population of sage-grouse, ranchers can monitor the rate at which cattle consume the tussocks in between sagebrush bushes. Once cattle have consumed around 40% of the tussocks in between bushes, researchers ask that ranchers move their cattle to new grazing trail.

GPS trackers show that sage grouse congregate in small areas with certain resources, rather than being widely spread.

US federal conservation plans have been met with lawsuits from wildlife organizations.

On December 6, 2018, according to the New York Times:

The Trump administration on Thursday published documents detailing its plan to roll back Obama-era protections for the vast habitat of the greater sage grouse, a chickenlike bird that roams across nearly 11 million acres [4.5 million hectares] in 10 oil-rich Western states.

The earlier proposal to protect the bird, whose waning numbers have brought it close to endangerment, was put forth under the Interior Department in 2015 and set out to ban or sharply reduce oil and gas drilling in 10.7 million acres [4.3 million hectares] of its habitat.

The Trump plan, by contrast, would limit the grouse’s protected habitat to just 1.8 million acres [730,000 hectares], essentially opening up 9 million acres [3.6 million hectares] of land to drilling, mining and other development.

== As a mascot ==
The sagehen is the mascot of the Pomona-Pitzer Sagehens, the joint athletics program for Pomona College and Pitzer College, two of the Claremont Colleges.
