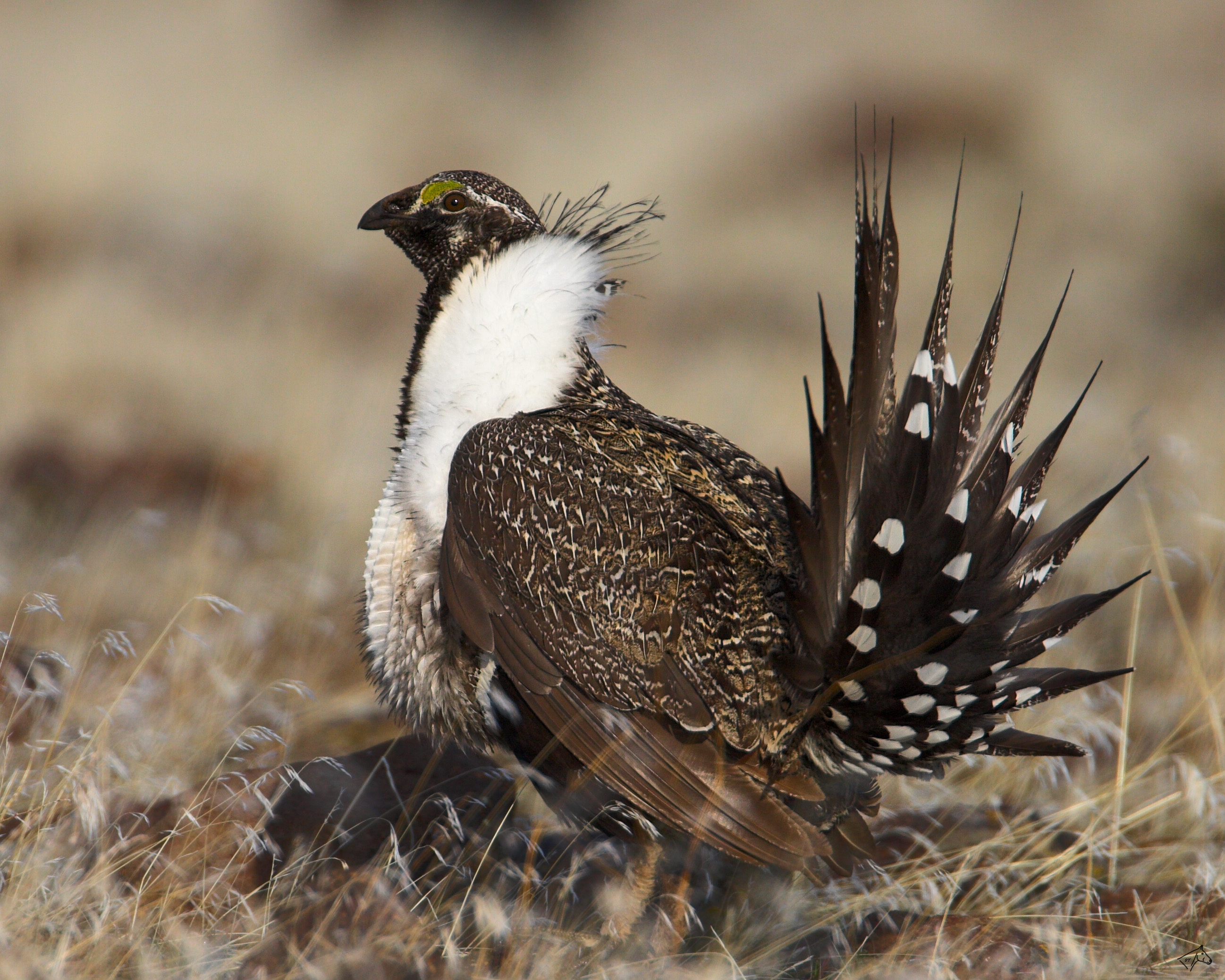
- Male in US

Conservation status
- Vulnerable (IUCN 3.1)

- Vulnerable (NatureServe)

Scientific classification
- Kingdom: Animalia
- Phylum: Chordata
- Class: Aves
- Order: Galliformes
- Family: Phasianidae
- Genus: Centrocercus
- Species: C. urophasianus

Binomial name
- Centrocercus urophasianus (Bonaparte, 1827)

Subspecies
- C. u. urophasianus; C. u. phaios
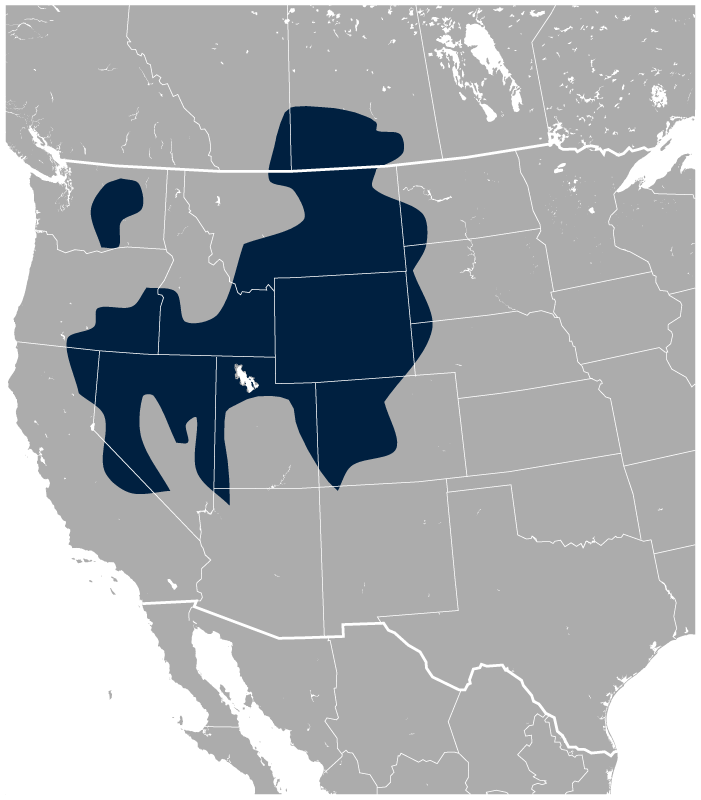
- Sage grouse range

= Greater sage-grouse =

Species of bird

The greater sage-grouse (Centrocercus urophasianus), also known as the sagehen, is the largest grouse in North America. Its range is sagebrush country in the western United States and southern Alberta and Saskatchewan, Canada. It was known as simply the sage grouse until the Gunnison sage-grouse was recognized as a separate species in 2000. The Mono Basin population of sage grouse may also be distinct.

The greater sage-grouse is a permanent resident in its breeding grounds but may move short distances to lower elevations during winter. It makes use of a complex lek system in mating and nests on the ground under sagebrush or grass patches. It forages on the ground, mainly eating sagebrush but also other plants and insects. Greater sage-grouse do not have a muscular crop and are not able to digest hard seeds like other grouse.

The species is in decline across its range due to habitat loss, and has been recognized as threatened or near threatened by several national and international organizations.

== Description ==
Adult greater sage-grouse have a long, pointed tail and legs with feathers to the toes. The adult male has a yellow patch over each eye, is grayish on top with a white breast, and has a dark brown throat and a black belly; two yellowish sacs on the neck are inflated during courtship display. The adult female is mottled gray-brown with a light brown throat and dark belly. Adult males range in length from 66–76 cm (26–30 in) and weigh between 2.3–3.2 kg (5.1–7.1 lb). Adult females are smaller, ranging in length from 48–58 cm (19–23 in) and weighing between 1.3–1.75 kg (2.9–3.9 lb).

== Distribution and habitat ==
Greater sage-grouse are obligate residents of the sagebrush (Artemisia spp.) ecosystem, usually inhabiting sagebrush-grassland or juniper (Juniperus spp.) sagebrush-grassland communities. Meadows surrounded by sagebrush may be used as feeding grounds. Use of meadows with a crown cover of silver sagebrush (A. cana) is especially important in Nevada during the summer.

Greater sage-grouse occur throughout the range of big sagebrush (A. tridentata), except on the periphery of big sagebrush distribution. Greater sage-grouse prefer mountain big sagebrush (A. t. subsp. vaseyana) and Wyoming big sagebrush (A. t. subsp. wyomingensis) communities to basin big sagebrush (A. t. subsp. tridentata) communities.

Sagebrush cover types other than big sagebrush can fulfill greater sage-grouse habitat requirements; in fact, the grouse may prefer other sagebrush cover types to big sagebrush. Greater sage-grouse in Antelope Valley, California, for example, use black sagebrush (A. nova) cover types more often than the more common big sagebrush cover types. Hens with broods on the National Antelope Refuge in Oregon were most frequently found (54–67% of observations) in low sagebrush (A. arbuscula) cover. Desert shrub habitat may also be used by greater sage-grouse.

Sagebrush communities supporting greater sage-grouse include silver sagebrush and fringed sagebrush (A. frigida).

Their historic range spanned 16 American states and Alberta, British Columbia, and Saskatchewan in Canada. Between 1988 and 2012, the Canadian population declined by 98%. By 2012, they were extinct in British Columbia and left with only remnant populations in Alberta with 40 to 60 adult birds, and in Saskatchewan with only 55 to 80 adult birds. By 2013, sage grouse were also lost from five U.S. states. In 2013, the Canadian Governor in Council on behalf of the Minister of the Environment, under the Species at Risk Act, annexed an emergency order for the protection of the greater sage-grouse.

Sage-grouse are largely resident, but in Idaho have been known to move up to 80–160 km (50–99 mi) in winter to avoid deep snow.

== Ecology ==
=== Lek mating system ===
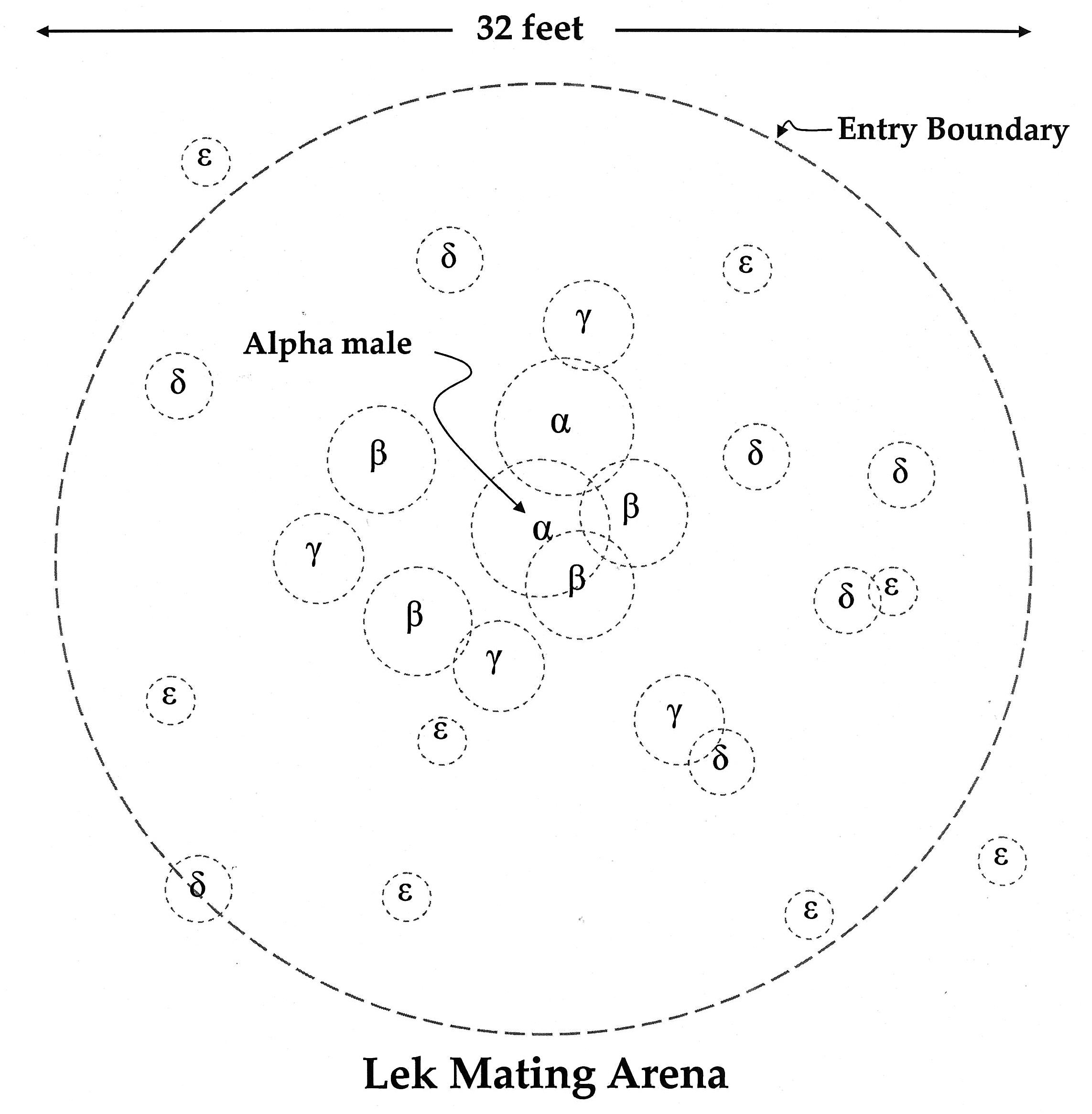
Lek mating arena, in which each male guards a territory of a few meters in size on average, and in which the dominant males may each attract up to eight females. In addition, each individual is shown with variations in personal space (bubbles), whereby higher-ranking individuals have larger personal space bubbles. Common bird leks typically have 25–30 individuals. A strict hierarchy accords the most desirable top-ranking males the most prestigious central territory, with ungraded and lesser aspirants ranged outside. Females come to these arenas to choose mates when the males' hierarchy has become established, and preferentially mate with the dominants in the centre.

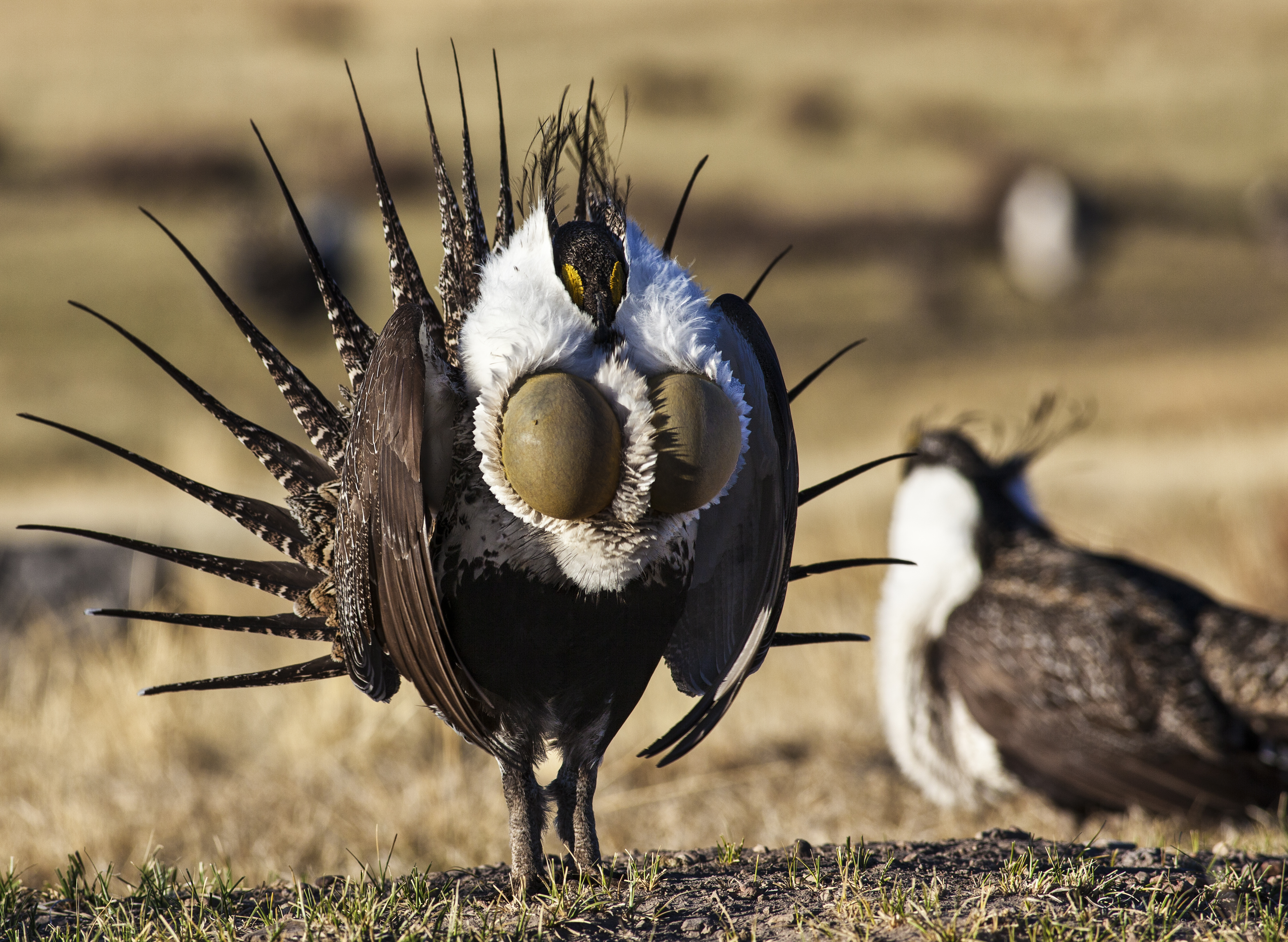
A male with its gular sacs inflated

Greater sage-grouse are notable for their elaborate courtship rituals. Each spring, males congregate in leks and perform a "strutting display". Groups of females observe these displays and select the most attractive males with which to mate. The dominant male located in the center of the lek typically copulates with around 80% of the females on the lek. Males perform in leks for several hours in the early morning and evening during the spring. Males gather in leks to court, usually in late February to April. Only a few dominant males, usually two, breed. Sage grouse mating behaviors are complex. After mating, the hen leaves the lek for the nesting grounds.

Open areas such as swales, irrigated fields, meadows, burns, roadsides, and areas with low, sparse sagebrush cover are used as leks. Of 45 leks, 11 were on windswept ridges or exposed knolls, 10 were in flat sagebrush, seven were in bare openings, and the remaining 17 were on various other site types. Leks are usually surrounded by areas with 20 to 50% sagebrush cover, with sagebrush no more than 30 cm (12 in) tall. Daily morning lek attendance by male Sage grouse can vary considerably between years, with lower attendance on days with precipitation.

=== Nest selection ===
Greater sage-grouse disperse to areas surrounding the leks for nesting. In a study of habitat selection by male greater sage grouse in central Montana during breeding season, sagebrush height and canopy cover at 110 daytime feeding and loafing sites of cocks were recorded. About 80% of the locations occurred in sagebrush with a canopy cover of 20–50%. In another Montana study, sagebrush cover averaged 30% on a cock-use area, and no cocks were observed in areas of less than 10% canopy cover.

Some females probably travel between leks. In Mono County, California, the home range of marked females during one month of the breeding season was 304 to 354 hectares (750 to 875 acres), enough area to include several active leks. DNA from feathers dropped at leks showed that about 1% of grouse may travel long distances to explore breeding areas up to 190 km (120 mi) away, a type of long-distance dispersal that can potentially boost populations and temper inbreeding.

Within a week to ten days following breeding, the hen builds a nest in the vicinity of the lek. Hens usually nest near the lekking grounds, but some hens have been noted to fly as far as 32 km (20 mi) to favorable nesting sites.

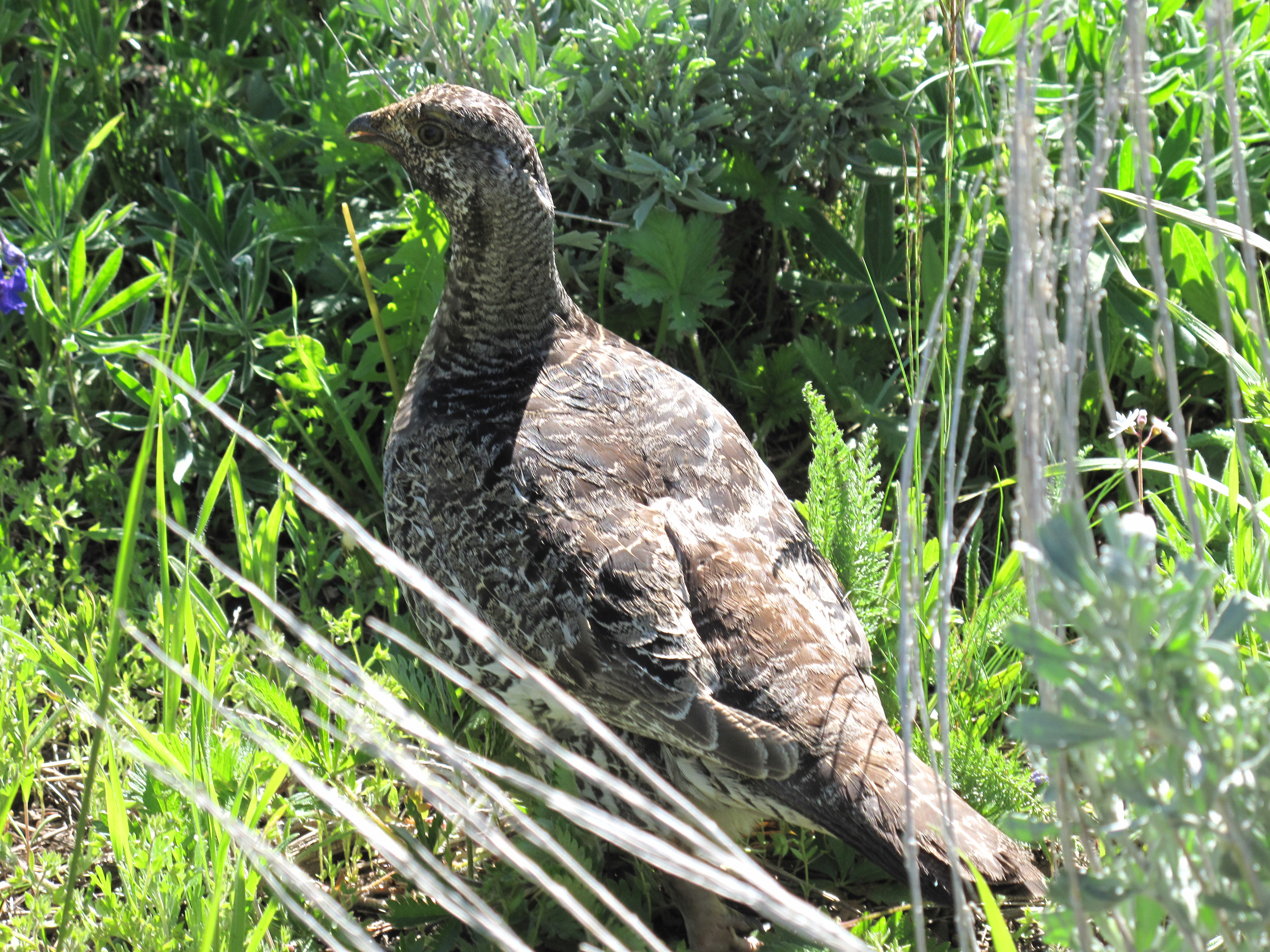
A female greater sage-grouse

Quality of nesting habitat surrounding the lek is the most important factor in population success. Adequacy of cover is critical for nesting. Too little can exist: where 13% was the average total crown cover on Idaho range, nests were located where average cover was 17%. No hens nested in the most arid, open areas with less than 10% total shrub cover. Too much also can occur: average shrub cover at 87 nest sites was 18.4%, and in more dense cover, greater sage-grouse did not nest where total shrub cover was greater than 25%. In Utah, no nests occurred where threetip sagebrush cover exceeded 35%.

Sagebrush forms the nesting cover for most greater sage-grouse nests throughout the West, with concealment being the basic requirement. Rabbitbrush (Chrysothamnus spp.) is occasionally used for nesting cover with greasewood (Sarcobatus vermiculatus) and shadscale (Atriplex canescens) being rarely used.

Greater sage-grouse prefer relatively tall sagebrush with an open canopy for nesting. In Utah, 33% of 161 nests were under silver sagebrush that was 36 to 64 cm (14 to 25 in) tall, while big sagebrush of the same height accounted for 24% of nests. In a threetip sagebrush (A. tripartata) habitat averaging 20 cm (7.9 in) in height, hens selected the tallest plants for nesting cover. Similarly in Wyoming, 92% of nests in Wyoming big sagebrush were in areas where vegetation was 25 to 51 cm (10 to 20 in) tall and cover did not exceed 50%.

In Montana, when sagebrush characteristics around 31 successful and 10 unsuccessful nests were compared, successful nests had greater than average sagebrush cover surrounding the nest and were located in stands with a higher average canopy cover (27%) than unsuccessful nests (20%). The average height of sagebrush cover over all nests was 40 cm (15.9 in) as compared to an average height of 23 cm (9.2 in) in adjacent areas.

During the nesting season, cocks and hens without nests use "relatively open" areas for feeding, and roost in "dense" patches of sagebrush.

=== Brood rearing ===
Clutch size ranges from six to eight eggs; incubation time is 25 to 27 days. The eggs measure 5.5–5.8 cm (2.2–2.3 in) in length and 3.8–3.9 cm (1.5–1.5 in) in width. Greater sage-grouse apparently have high rates of nest desertion and nest predation. Data from several sage grouse studies indicate a range of nesting success from 23.7 to 60.3%, with predation accounting for 26 to 76% of lost nests.

Chicks are precocial and can feed themselves. They fly by two weeks of age, although their movements are limited until they are two to three weeks old. They can do sustained flight by five to six weeks old. Juveniles are relatively independent by the time they have completed their first molt at 10 to 12 weeks old.

== Diet ==
=== Adults ===
The importance of sagebrush in the diet of adult greater sage-grouse is great; numerous studies have documented its year-round use. A Montana study, based on 299 crop samples, showed that 62% of total food volume of the year was sagebrush. Between December and February, it was the only food item found in all crops. Only between June and September did sagebrush constitute less than 60% of their diet. Sage grouse select sagebrush species differentially. Greater sage-grouse in Antelope Valley, California, browsed black sagebrush more frequently than the more common big sagebrush. The browse of black sagebrush is highly preferred by greater sage-grouse in Nevada. In southeastern Idaho, black sagebrush was preferred as forage.

Among the big sagebrush subspecies, basin big sagebrush is less nutritious and higher in terpenes than either mountain or Wyoming big sagebrush. Sage grouse prefer the other two subspecies to basin big sagebrush. In a common garden study done in Utah, greater sage-grouse preferred mountain big sagebrush over Wyoming and basin big sagebrush.

Sage grouse lack a muscular gizzard and cannot grind and digest seeds; they must consume soft-tissue foods. Apart from sagebrush, the adult diet consists largely of herbaceous leaves, which are used primarily in late spring and summer. Additionally, greater sage-grouse use perennial bunchgrasses for food.

Sage grouse are highly selective grazers, choosing only a few plant genera. Dandelion (Taraxacum spp.), legumes (Fabaceae), yarrow (Achillea spp.) and wild lettuce (Lactuca spp.) account for most of their forb intake. From July to September, dandelion comprised 45% of forb intake; sagebrush comprised 34%. Collectively, dandelion, sagebrush, and two legume genera (Trifolium and Astragalus) contributed more than 90% of the greater sage-grouse diet. Insects are a minor diet item for adults. Insects comprised 2% of the adult diet in spring and fall and 9% in summer. Sagebrush made up 71% of the year-round diet.

=== Females before laying ===
Herbaceous dicots are used heavily by females before egg laying and may be essential for their nutrition because of their high protein and nutrient content.

Favored foods of prelaying and brood-rearing greater sage-grouse hens in Oregon are common dandelion (Taraxacum officinale), goatsbeard (Tragopogon dubius), western yarrow (Achillea millefolium), prickly lettuce (Lactuca serriola), and sego lily (Calochortus macrocarpus).

=== Juveniles ===
In their first week of life, greater sage-grouse chicks consume primarily insects, especially ants and beetles. Their diet then switches to forbs, with sagebrush gradually assuming primary importance. In a Utah study, forbs composed 54–60% of the summer diet of juveniles, while the diet of adult birds was 39–47% forbs.

A Wyoming study evaluated effects of eliminating insects from the diet of newly hatched greater sage-grouse chicks. All chicks hatched in captivity and not provided insects died between the ages of 4 and 10 days, whereas all chicks fed insects survived the first 10 days. Captive chicks required insects for survival until they were at least three weeks old. Chicks more than three weeks old survived without insects, but their growth rates were lowered significantly, indicating insects were still required for normal growth after three weeks of age. As quantity of insects in the diet increased, survival and growth rates also increased up to 45 days, the length of the experiment.

In a study conducted in Idaho, Klebenow and Gray measured food items for juvenile greater sage-grouse for each age class, classes being defined by weeks since birth. In the first week, insects were very important – 52% of the total diet. Beetles, primarily family Scarabaeidae, were the main food item. Beetles were taken by all other age classes of chicks, but in smaller amounts. All ages fed upon ants, and while the volume was generally low, ants were found in most of the crops. After week 3, insect volume dropped and stayed at a lower level throughout all the age classes, fluctuating but always under 25%.

With plants like common dandelion and goatsbeard, all aboveground parts of the plant were sometimes eaten. The stems, however, were not of main importance. The reproductive parts, mainly buds, flowers, and capsules, were the only parts taken from some of the other species. Conversely, leaves were the only parts of sagebrush found in the crops. Leaves and flowers of the species listed above and other dicots contained higher amounts of crude protein, calcium, and phosphorus than sagebrush and may be important in greater sage-grouse diets for these reasons.

=== Water ===
Greater sage-grouse apparently do not require open water for day-to-day survival if succulent vegetation is available. They use free water if it is available, however. Their distribution is apparently seasonally limited by water in some areas. In summer, greater sage-grouse in desert regions occur only near streams, springs, and water holes. In winter in Eden Valley, Wyoming, they have been observed regularly visiting partially frozen streams to drink from holes in the ice.

== Predators ==
Video of a greater sage-grouse hen and brood responding to an alarm from a predator

Predators are commonly believed to reduce greater sage-grouse populations and of most importance is timing of death. Nest loss to predators is most important when potential production of young and recruitment are seriously impacted. Lack of adequate nesting and brooding cover may account for high juvenile losses in many regions. Nest success is related to herbaceous cover near the nest site. Taller, more dense herbaceous cover apparently reduces nest predation and likely increases early brood survival. Although predators were the proximate factor influencing nest loss, the ultimate cause may relate to the vegetation available to nesting grouse. Tall, dense vegetation may provide visual, scent, and physical barriers between predators and nests of ground-nesting birds. Greater amounts of both tall grass and medium-height shrub cover were associated collectively with a lower probability of nest predation. In a series of Nevada studies, artificial nest predation experiments were conducted. Artificial nests experienced 100% mortality with the loss of 1,400 eggs in 200 simulated nests in two weeks in one study, 84% of the nests were destroyed in three days in another study, while just 3% of the nests were destroyed in 10 days in an area of significantly better cover.

Generally, quantity and quality of habitats used by greater sage-grouse control the degree of predation, so predation would be expected to be most important as habitat size and herbaceous cover within sagebrush decreases. A decline in preferred prey may also result in increased predation on greater sage-grouse. In southeastern Oregon, a decline in black-tailed jackrabbit (Lepus californicus) numbers may have caused predators to switch to greater sage-grouse as their primary prey.

Predator species include coyotes (Canis latrans), bobcats (Lynx rufus), American badgers (Taxidea taxus), falcons (Falconidae), and hawks and eagles (Accipitridae sp.) prey on adult and juveniles. Crows and ravens (Corvus sp.) and magpies (Pica sp.) consume juvenile birds. Coyotes, ground squirrels (Sciuridae spp.), and badgers are the most important mammalian nest predators. Among bird species, magpies and ravens commonly prey on Greater sage-grouse nests.

Greater sage-grouse are a popular game bird. Mortality due to hunting is generally considered to be compensatory and replacive, where until mortality reaches a "threshold value", it has no effect on population levels. Data are not available to suggest that closed or restricted hunting seasons will materially affect overall population levels on their primary range.

In a study on hunting in a low-density greater sage-grouse population in Nevada, low populations may be a result of factors other than hunting. Protecting one greater sage-grouse population from hunting while doubling the birds harvested in a four-year period on another population showed, despite low recruitment, both populations increased to nearly the same density. In an Oregon study, no relationship was found between the rate of summer recruitment (chicks/adult) and harvest by hunters, nor was any significant relationship found between the size of the fall harvest and population trends during the subsequent spring.

== Conservation ==
Residential building and energy development have caused the greater sage-grouse population to decline from 16 million 100 years ago to between 200,000 and 500,000 today.

This species is in decline due to loss of habitat; the bird's range has shrunk in historical times, having become extinct in British Columbia, Kansas, and Nebraska. Though the greater sage-grouse as a whole is not considered endangered by the IUCN, local populations may be in serious danger of extinction. In May 2000, the Canadian Species at Risk Act listed the subspecies Centrocercus urophasianus phaios, formerly found in British Columbia, as being extinct in Canada. The presence of subfossil bones at Conkling Cave and Shelter Cave in southern New Mexico show that the species was present south of its current range at the end of the last ice age, leading some experts to project that the species could become increasingly vulnerable as global climate change increases the humidity in semiarid regions.

=== United States ===
In the United States, the species was a candidate for listing under the Endangered Species Act, but the US Fish and Wildlife Service (USFWS) was forced by the US Congress not to grant endangered species status in September 2015.

The original petition to list the greater sage-grouse was mailed to the USFWS in June 2002 by Craig Dremann of Redwood City. Dremann, for his petition, quoted a Department of Interior document about the declining status of the bird, putting the USFWS in the difficult position of having to argue against another Federal agency's findings. The reason why Dremann sought the listing, is after driving across the bird's range in 1997, and noting what vegetation grew at each post mile, from California to South Dakota and back, recorded how damaged and destroyed the native sagebrush understory habitat had become from lack of management of the grazing of public lands.

The following groups have supported Dremann's petition to list: American Lands Alliance, Biodiversity Conservation Alliance, Center for Biological Diversity, Center for Native Ecosystems, WildEarth Guardians, the Fund for Animals, Gallatin Wildlife Association, Great Old Broads for Wilderness, Hells Canyon Preservation Council, The Larch Company, The Northwest Coalition for Alternatives to Pesticides, Northwest Ecosystem Alliance, Oregon Natural Desert Association, Oregon Natural Resources Council, Predator Defense Institute, Sierra Club, Sinapu, Western Fire Ecology Center, Western Watersheds Project, Wild Utah Project, and Wildlands CPR.

In 2010, after a second review, the Department of the Interior assigned the greater sage-grouse a status known as "warranted but precluded", essentially putting it on a waiting list (behind more critically threatened species) for federal protection.

Since half of all remaining sage grouse habitat is on private lands, the USDA's Natural Resources Conservation Service launched the Sage Grouse Initiative, a partnership-based, science-driven, Farm Bill-funded effort that uses voluntary incentives to proactively conserve America's western rangelands, wildlife, and rural way of life. The Sage Grouse Initiative has partnered with 1,500+ ranchers across 11 states since 2010, conserving 5.5 million acres of sage grouse habitat (twice the size of Yellowstone National Park).

In April 2014, the Sage-grouse and Endangered Species Conservation and Protection Act (H.R.4419) was introduced in the U.S. House of Representatives to prohibit the federal government from listing sage grouse under the Endangered Species Act for 10 years, as long as states prepare and carry out plans to protect the species within their borders.

Facing a court-ordered deadline of October 2015, the Department of the Interior on 22 September 2015, was forced by the US Congress just before the deadline, by adding language in the 2015 Appropriations bill to stop the listing, not to list the bird as threatened or endangered under the Endangered Species Act (ESA). The language in the 2015 bill, "Prohibits funds from being used to write or issue rules pursuant to the Endangered Species Act of 1973 and related to the sage-grouse".

As rationale for its decision, the Department said it would rely on a new land-management plan to protect the sage grouse's habitat of 165 million acres across eleven Western states. The designation under the ESA would likely have led to land-use and other restrictions that critics feared would have economic impacts, possibly restricting oil and gas development and homebuilding. In issuing its finding, the FWS stated that:

A status review conducted by the Service has found that the greater sage-grouse remains relatively abundant and well-distributed across the species' 173-million acre range and does not face the risk of extinction now or in the foreseeable future. The Service's decision follows an unprecedented conservation partnership across the western United States that has significantly reduced threats to the greater sage-grouse across 90% of the species' breeding habitat. The Service has determined that protection for the greater sage-grouse under the Endangered Species Act is no longer warranted and is withdrawing the species from the candidate species list.

This measure was repeated in the 2016 appropriations bill. For the 2017 bill, the Columbia Basin population was added — Sec. 114:

None of the funds made available by this or any other Act may be used by the Secretary of the Interior to write or issue pursuant to section 4 of the Endangered Species Act of 1973 (16 U.S.C. 1533)--

(1) a proposed rule for greater sage-grouse (Centrocercus urophasianus);

(2) a proposed rule for the Columbia basin distinct population segment of greater sage-grouse.

For the 2018 appropriations bill, over the objections of conservationists and the Democratic party, Congress applied similar measures to two other species: the gray wolf and the lesser prairie-chicken.

Despite the Department of the Interior's decision not to list the greater sage-grouse as threatened or endangered, legal efforts to protect the sage-grouse continue. For instance, in May 2016 the United States Court of Appeals for the Ninth Circuit ruled that a planned wind energy project in Harney County, Oregon, could not proceed until the Bureau of Land Management adequately studied whether the project site provided winter habitat for sage-grouse.

On 6 December 2018, the government announced a plan to roll back protections for the sage grouse to open nine million acres of land to wind and solar farms, drilling, mining, and cornfields for the production of government mandated ethanol.

=== Canada ===
The Committee on the Status of Endangered Wildlife in Canada (COSEWIC) designated the greater sage-grouse as Threatened in 1997, and re-designated the species as Endangered in April 1998. The status was reevaluated and confirmed in May 2000 and April 2008. The greater sage-grouse is listed on Schedule 1 of Canada's Species at Risk Act, as Endangered.

In 2013, the Canadian Governor in Council on behalf of the Minister of the Environment, under the Species at Risk Act, annexed an emergency order for the protection of the greater sage-grouse. This order, among other things, prohibits killing of sagebrush plants, native grasses, or native forbs, and the building of fences and other structures in certain areas. The order is implemented "to protect a listed wildlife species on both federal and non-federal lands when the competent Minister is of the opinion that the species faces imminent threats to its survival or recovery".

Over the past several decades, Canada's sage-grouse population has been reduced to remnant populations in Alberta and Saskatchewan. Historically, sage-grouse occurred in at least 16 states within the western U.S. and three provinces in Canada (Alberta, British Columbia, and Saskatchewan). Sage-grouse are now extirpated from British Columbia and five U.S. states. The sage-grouse population has continued to decline despite the provincial recovery strategies produced in 2001, 2006, and 2008. According to the Committee on the Status of Endangered Wildlife in Canada (COSEWIC), between 1988 and 2012, the total Canadian population of the sage-grouse declined by 98%. Current provincial population estimates from 2012 in Alberta are 40 to 60 adult birds and 55 to 80 adult birds in Saskatchewan".

— Emergency Order for the Protection of the Greater Sage-Grouse 2013

In 2014, a ten-year captive breeding program for greater sage-grouse was initiated at the Calgary Zoo. Despite only two of thirteen hatched birds surviving to the age of seven months, the program will proceed.

== In popular culture ==
A sage-grouse, Cecil the Sagehen, is the mascot of the Pomona-Pitzer Sagehens, the joint athletics program of Pomona College and Pitzer College, two liberal arts colleges in Claremont, California.
