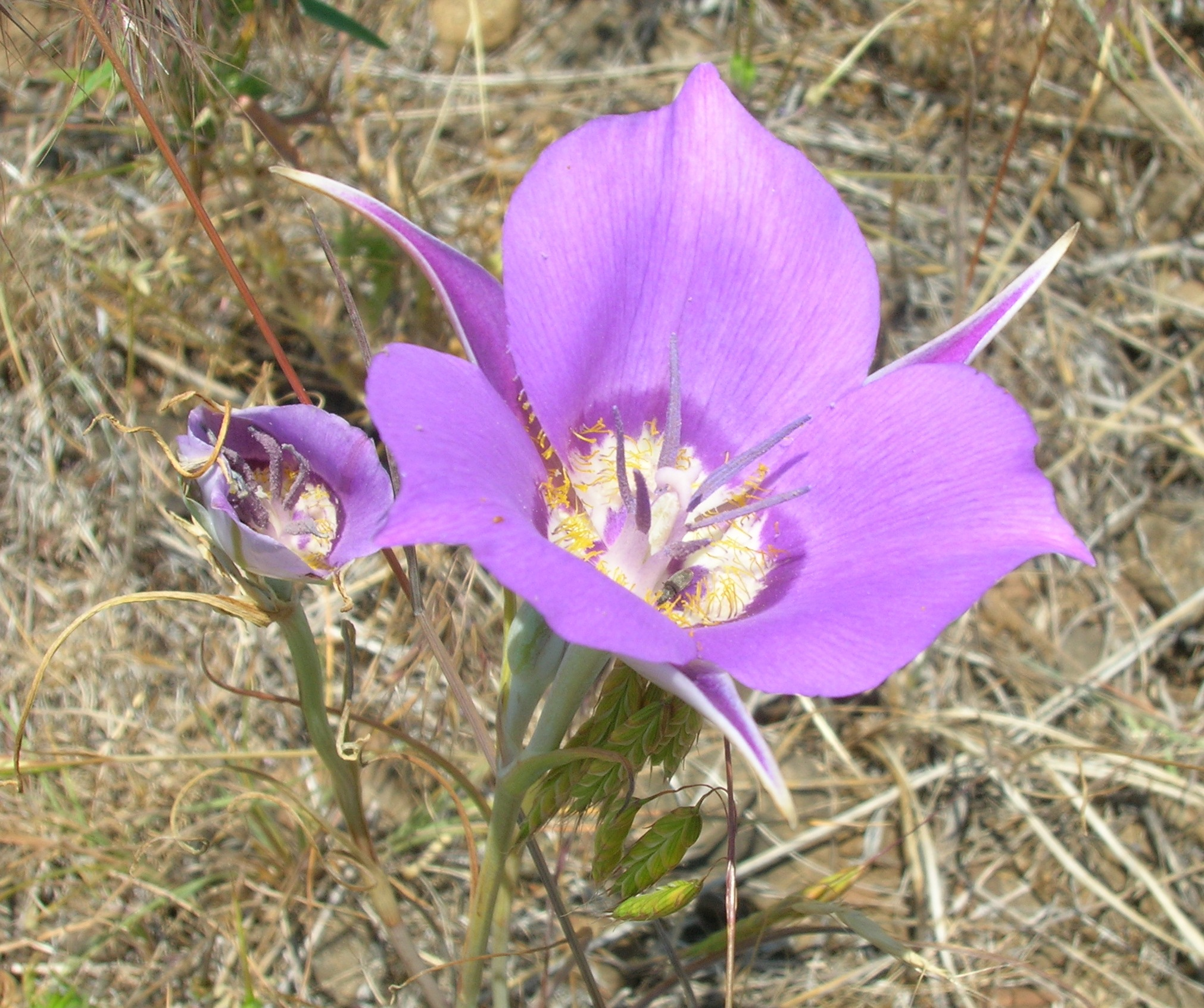

Scientific classification
- Kingdom: Plantae
- Clade: Tracheophytes
- Clade: Angiosperms
- Clade: Monocots
- Order: Liliales
- Family: Liliaceae
- Genus: Calochortus
- Species: C. macrocarpus

Binomial name
- Calochortus macrocarpus Dougl.

Synonyms
- Mariposa macrocarpa (Douglas) Hoover

= Calochortus macrocarpus =

Species of flowering plant

Calochortus macrocarpus, also known as sagebrush mariposa lily, is a North American species of bulbous perennials in the lily family.

== Distribution ==
The plant is native to the Northwestern United States (Washington, Oregon, Idaho, and western Montana), northern California, northern Nevada, and a small area of southern British Columbia. Habitats include the Great Basin and Cascade Range.

== Description ==
Calochortus macrocarpus leaves are blue-green and grass-like. The bulbs are tapering, like a carrot.

The flowers are large and three-petaled, and are pink to purple and sometimes white, with a greenish stripe on their underside. The sepals are about 2 inches long, much narrower and slightly longer than the petals. They typically bloom in June and July.

== Uses ==
First peoples in southern British Columbia harvested the bulbs from April to June. They can be eaten raw or cooked.
