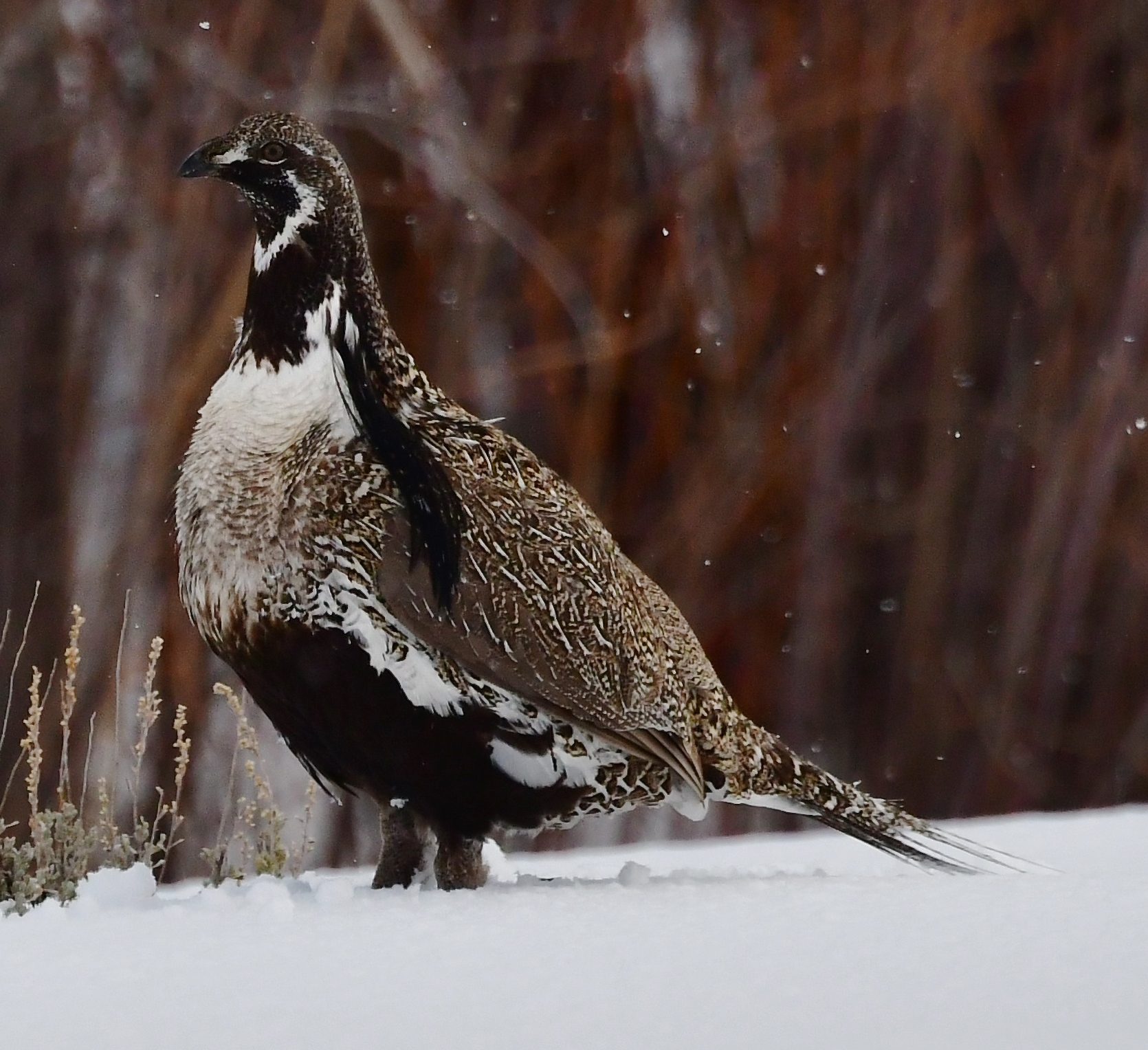

Conservation status
- Endangered (IUCN 3.1)

- Threatened (ESA)

Scientific classification
- Kingdom: Animalia
- Phylum: Chordata
- Class: Aves
- Order: Galliformes
- Family: Phasianidae
- Genus: Centrocercus
- Species: C. minimus

Binomial name
- Centrocercus minimus Young, Braun, C, Oyler-McCance, Hupp & Quinn, 2000
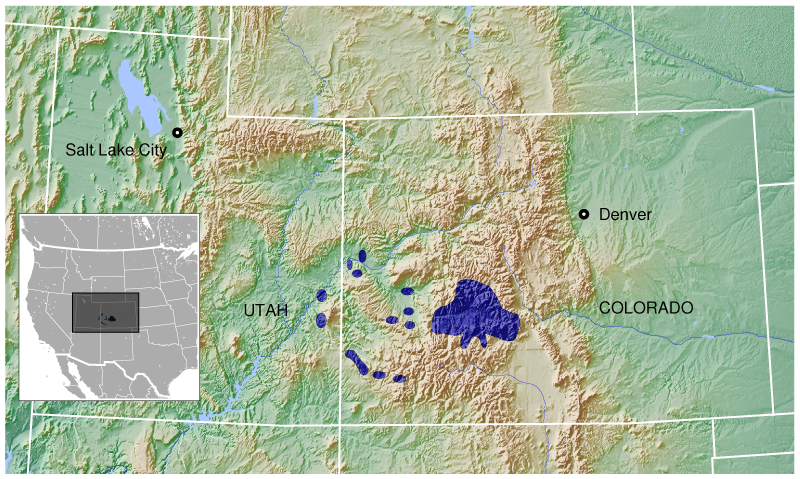
- Gunnison sage-grouse range

= Gunnison sage-grouse =

Species of bird

The Gunnison grouse, Gunnison sage-grouse or lesser sage-grouse (Centrocercus minimus) is a species of grouse endemic to the United States. It is similar to the closely related greater sage-grouse (Centrocercus urophasianus) in appearance, but about a third smaller in size, with much thicker plumes behind the head; it also has a less elaborate courtship dance. It is restricted in range to southwestern Colorado and extreme southeastern Utah, with the largest population residing in the Gunnison Basin region in Colorado.

== Distribution and habitat ==
Gunnison sage-grouse occur in seven counties in southwestern Colorado and one county in southeastern Utah. It was once found in Arizona, New Mexico, and Oklahoma, but is now extirpated in those states.

Gunnison sage-grouse are dependent on sagebrush-dominated habitats. Sagebrush is a crucial component of the adult's diet year-round, and they almost exclusively use sagebrush for cover. However, in order to rear a brood of chicks, the young require high protein broadleaved plants and wildflowers that bring insects, also for protein. However, cattle and sheep also eat these plants, and the removal of these critical chick-food plants is a major reason for this bird's decline.

== Taxonomy ==
Despite being native to a country where the avifauna is relatively well known, it was overlooked until the 1990s due to the similarities with the sage grouse, and only described as a new species in 2000—making it the first new avian species to be described from the USA since the 19th century. The description of C. minimus as a separate species is supported by a molecular study of genetic variation, showing that gene flow between the large-bodied and the small-bodied birds is absent.

== Description ==
The bird measures 46–56 cm (18–22 in) in length and weighs 1–2.43 kg (2.2–5.4 lb)

== Breeding ==
Gunnison sage-grouse are notable for their elaborate courtship rituals. Each spring, males congregate on leks and perform a "strutting display". Groups of females observe these displays and select the most attractive males with which to mate. Only a few males do most of the breeding. Males perform on leks for several hours in the early morning and evening during the spring. Leks are generally open areas adjacent to dense sagebrush stands, and the same lek may be used by grouse for decades.

Males gather on the lek or strutting grounds, which are small, open areas where breeding occurs, in late February to April, as soon as the lek is relatively free of snow. Only a few dominant males, usually two, breed. After mating, the hen leaves the lek for the nesting grounds. Clutch size ranges from 3 to 10 eggs; incubation time is 25 to 29 days. Eggs measure 5.4–5.6 cm (2.1–2.2 in) in length and 3.7–3.9 cm (1.5 in) in width. Sage-grouse apparently have high rates of nest desertion and nest predation. Chicks are precocial and can feed themselves.

Young are able to fly weakly after 10 days, and strongly after 5 weeks.

== Conservation ==
This species is in decline because of loss of habitat; its range has shrunk. Following petitions, the species was proposed for listing under the Endangered Species Act by the United States Fish and Wildlife Service, and was eventually protected as a threatened species starting on December 22, 2014. The known population size of this species remains quite small, and it was estimated that fewer than 4,000 individuals existed in when the species was successfully protected under the Act. A 2019 survey found the population in Colorado to be reduced to an estimated 1,800 birds with only around 429 reproductive males, a record low for the species since surveys began. The Nature Conservancy installed more than 750 one-rock dams to improve water retention and enrich habitat conditions for the grouse in a protected area.
