= Centennial Museum and Chihuahuan Desert Gardens =

Cultural history and natural history museum

- Location within Texas
- Established: 1936
- Location: 500 W. University Avenue; El Paso, Texas
- Coordinates: 31.769275°N 106.505821°W
- Director: Daniel Carey-Whalen
- Curator: Samantha Winer
- Parking: Permits at museum office
- Website: www.utep.edu/centennial-museum

The Centennial Museum and Chihuahuan Desert Gardens is a cultural history and natural history museum on the campus of the University of Texas at El Paso in El Paso, Texas, United States.The museum was built in 1936 to commemorate the centenary of Texas independence, making it the oldest museum in El Paso.

The Centennial Museum is an academic support and outreach unit of The University of Texas at El Paso focusing primarily on the natural and cultural history of the Chihuahuan Desert. It promotes and shares knowledge and understanding of the natural diversity of the region and its people. The museum meets its responsibilities through the presentation and curation of the permanent collections, including the Chihuahuan Desert Gardens. Furthermore, the museum promotes the scholarly research of UTEP students, faculty, and alumni, and supports the general mission of The University of Texas at El Paso.

== Collection ==
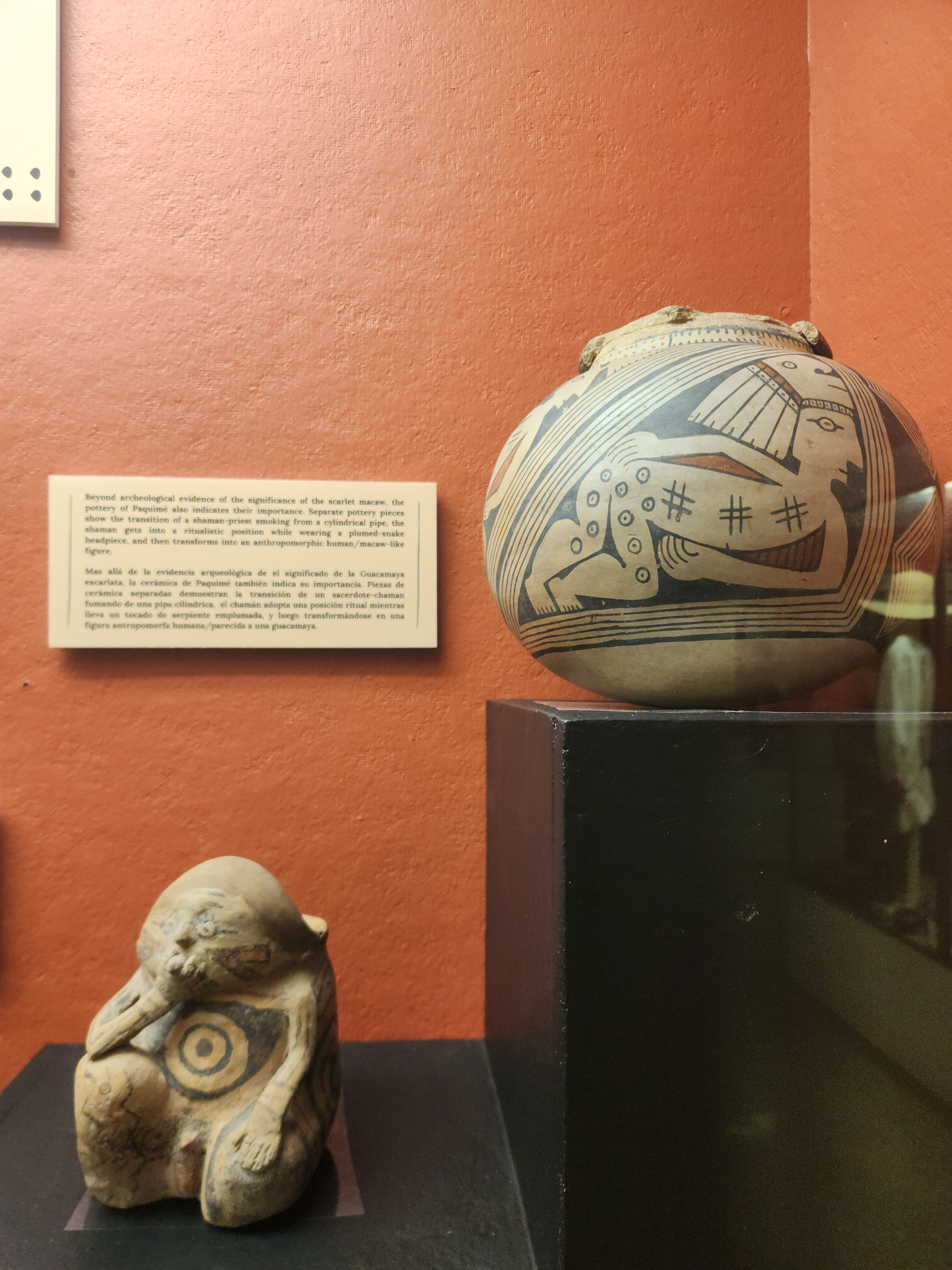
Human Effigy and Pottery at Casa Grandes Exhibit at Centennial Museum and Chihuahuan Desert Gardens

The Centennial Museum is located on the UTEP campus. Its cultural focus is on the indigenous, colonial, pre-urban, and folk cultures of the border regions of southwestern United States and Mexico. The natural history focus is on the geology and biology of the Southwest and Mexico, with particular emphasis on the Chihuahuan Desert. The permanent exhibits include paleontology, geology, ethnology, archaeology, and regional higher vertebrates. The museum has a collection of Casas Grandes pottery, with many items displayed on its website as well as on exhibit.

Temporary exhibits cover a wide range of subjects apropos to the museum's mission or to that of the University of Texas at El Paso. Emphasis tends to be on the El Paso Border Region of the United States and Mexico.

== Chihuahuan Desert Gardens ==
The Chihuahuan Desert Gardens on the museum's grounds feature over 600 species of native plants. The gardens are intended to demonstrate that the use of native plants in landscaping can be fulfilling in terms of beauty and water conservation. Over 600 species of plants native to the Greater Chihuahuan Desert Region are cultivated in a series of "theme" gardens. The gardens also serve as a resource for informal and formal botanical and environmental education. An extensive database of plant images and associated information is associated with the gardens. The Chihuahuan Desert Gardens cooperate with the University of Texas at El Paso Biodiversity Collections to develop and curate exhibitions related to the research being performed in the UTEP Biodiversity Collections as well as to provide specimens and information for community outreach.

The Chihuahuan Desert Gardens' website is one of the most extensive educational resources for the flora and fauna of the Chihuahuan Desert ecoregion on the internet for the layperson.

Other web material includes transcripts of over 1300 short radio presentations concerning Southwestern subjects aired by the local National Public Radio station, KTEP. Courses on the website include An Introduction to the Chihuahuan Desert and Mammalogy on the Web.

== Gallery ==
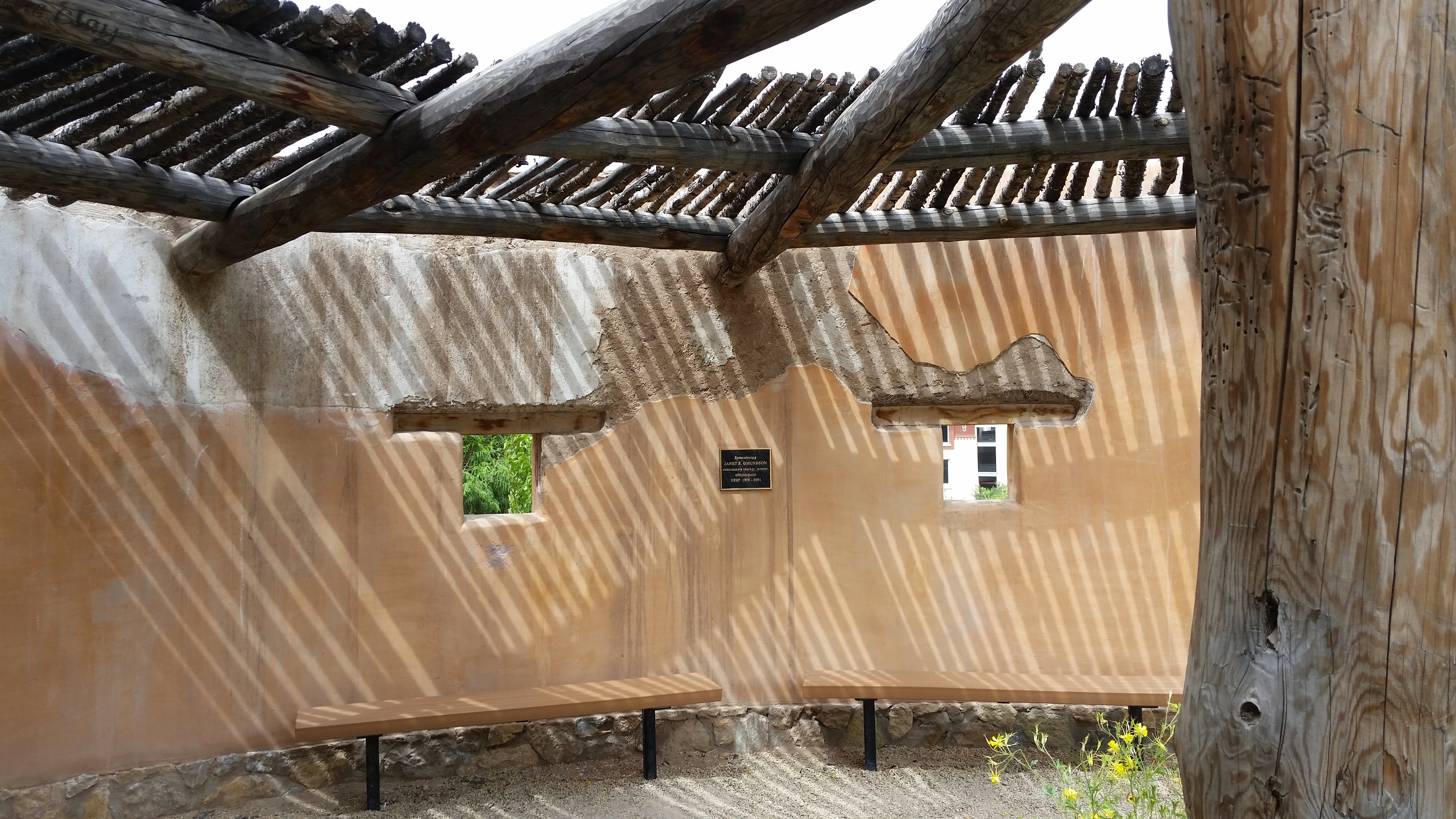
Nook in Chihuahuan Desert garden at UTEP.

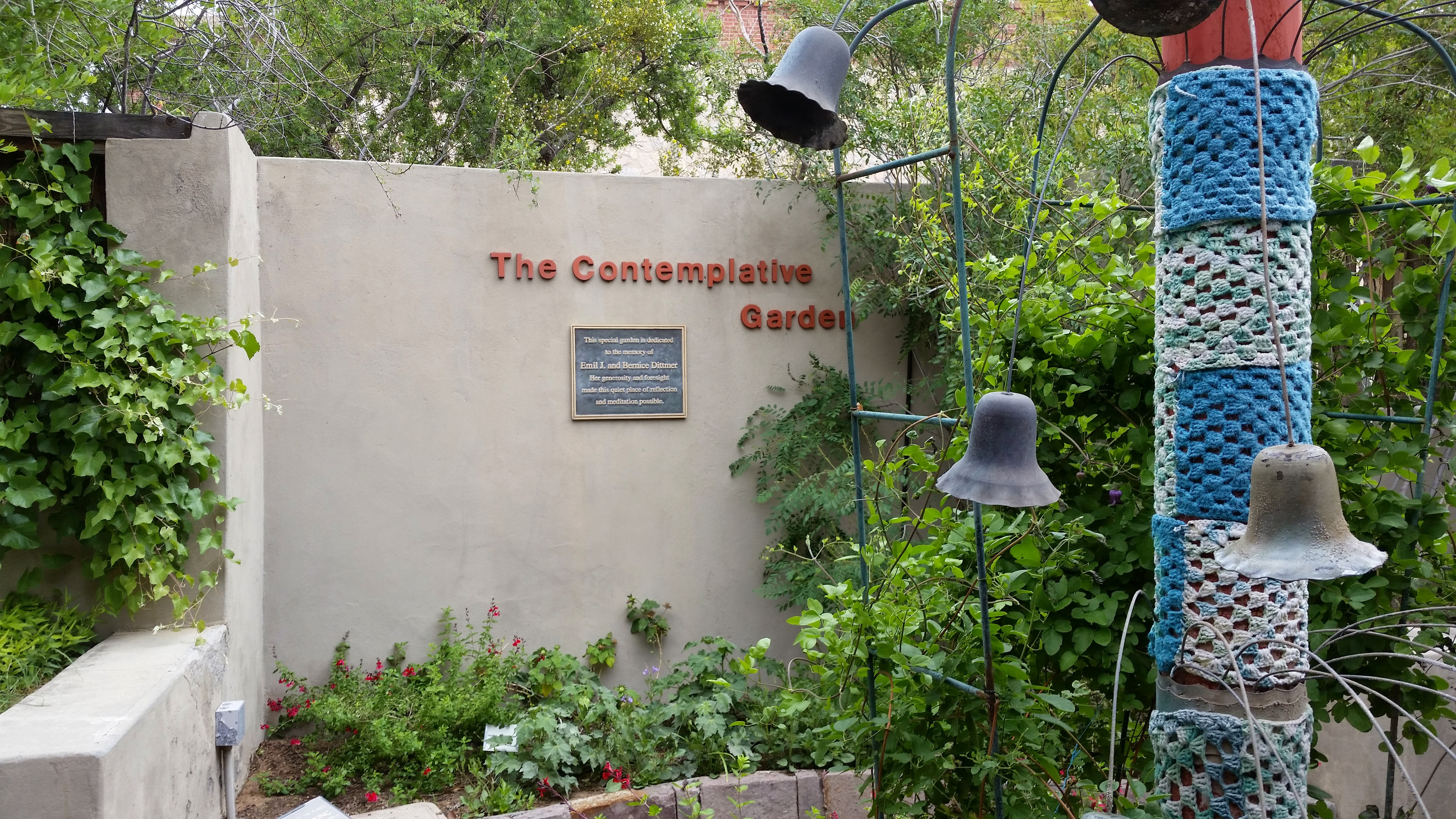
The Contemplative Garden.

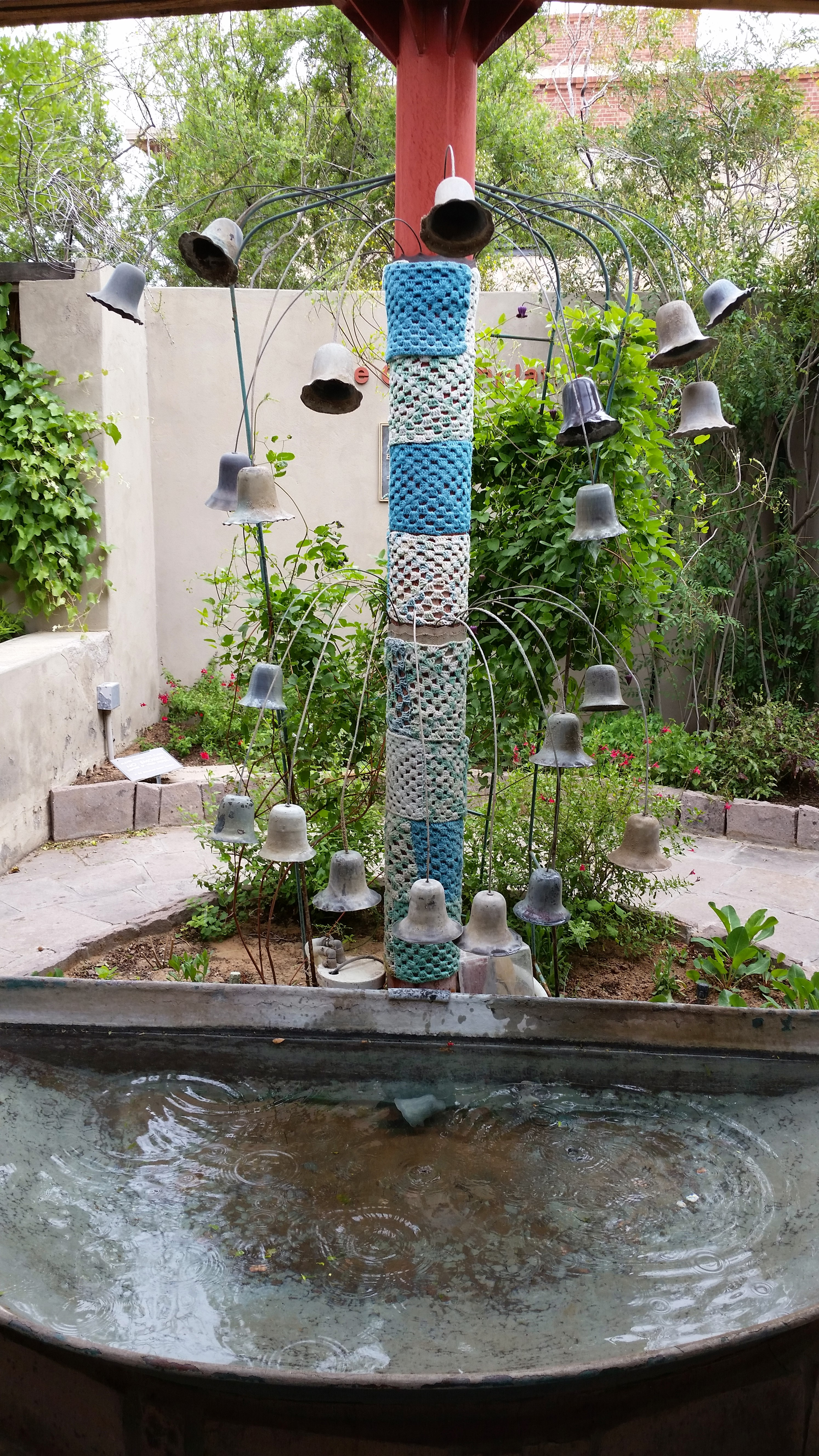
Pool in the Contemplative Garden

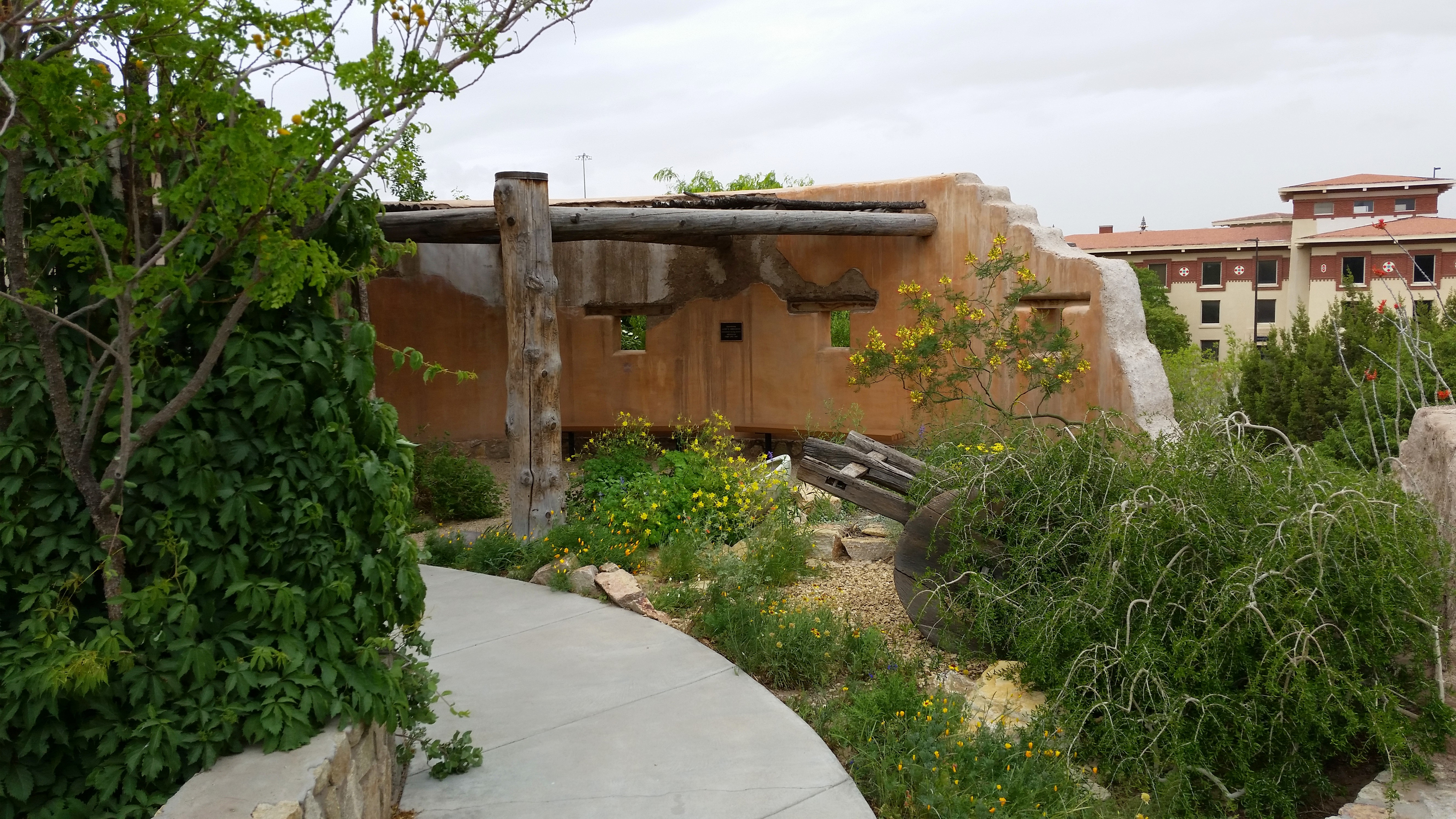
Garden walk

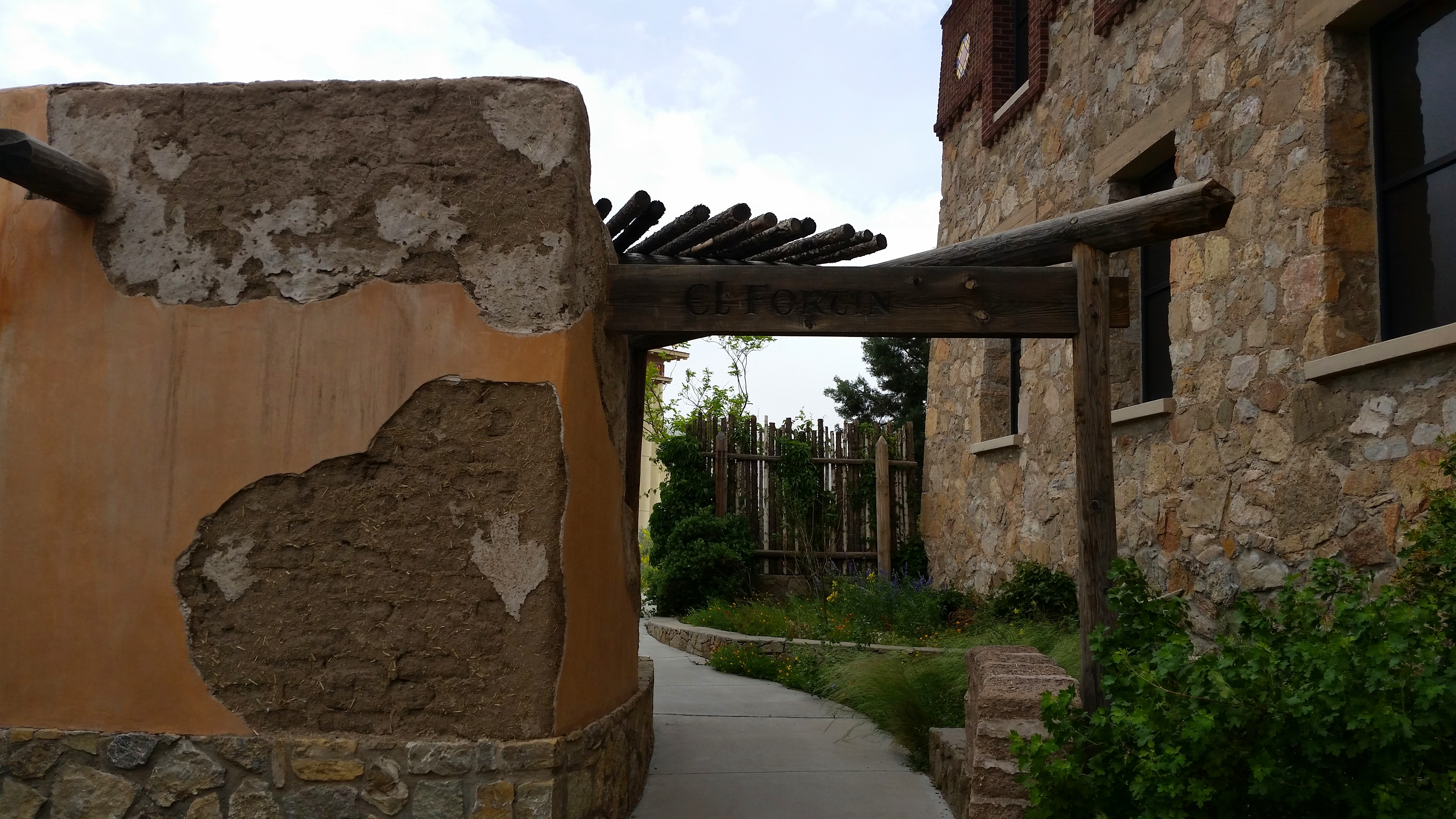
Chihuahuan Desert Garden walkway

== Admission, hours ==
Free to the public, with special needs access and limited parking. Tours are booked in advance.

Open Monday through Saturday, 10:00 am to 4:00 pm. Closed on university holidays and UTEP home football game days.

== See also ==
- Flora of the Chihuahuan Desert
