= Sialia =

Village in Odisha with no doors and windows

Sialia, also called the Doorless Village, is a village in Rajakanika Block, Kendrapara district, Odisha, India known for having no doors as the villagers claim they see no need to not trust their neighbours. 125 families are living inside this village, which has an area of 12 hectares. No house of this village has doors or windows as the people of this village have immense faith on Parvati, stating that the power of Parvati as Kharakhai will protect them.

Surrounded by large banyan trees, the Hindu temple of Parvati as Kharakhai is placed at the end of this village. The temple has no roof because Parvati (as Kharakhai) loves sunlight, as in the Odia language, sunlight means "Khara". Due to this, this village attracts tourists from different places. To maintain it, the district administration plans to invest funds to build parks, toilets, and parking.
