= Bishop's cap =

Bishop's cap is a common name for several plants and may refer to:

- Epimedium, a genus in the family Berberidaceae native to Eurasia
- Mitella, a genus in the family Ranunculaceae native to North America and Asia

== See also ==
- Astrophytum myriostigma, bishop's cap cactus
