= Bullfinch =

Bullfinch is a name given to two groups of passerine birds.

== True bullfinches ==
The true bullfinches are thick-billed finches in the passerine family Fringillidae. They comprise the genus Pyrrhula. These birds are distributed across Asia and Europe mainly in temperate forests, and exclude similar-looking birds found in the Americas. The Old World Pyrrhulae include the following:

- Eurasian bullfinch, Pyrrhula pyrrhula
- Brown bullfinch, Pyrrhula nipalensis
- White-cheeked bullfinch, Pyrrhula leucogenis
- Orange bullfinch, Pyrrhula aurantiaca
- Red-headed bullfinch, Pyrrhula erythrocephala
- Grey-headed bullfinch, Pyrrhula erythaca
- Azores bullfinch, Pyrrhula murina

== New World tanagers ==
There is an unrelated group of New World passerine birds also called bullfinches because of their superficial resemblances to the Old World Pyrrhula species. They were placed in the large bunting and American "sparrow" family Emberizidae, but are now considered tanagers (Thraupidae).

Two are in the genus Loxigilla:

- Lesser Antillean bullfinch, Loxigilla noctis
- Barbados bullfinch, Loxigilla barbadensis

Three are in the genus Melopyrrha:

- Cuban bullfinch, Melopyrrha nigra
- Puerto Rican bullfinch, Melopyrrha portoricensis
- Greater Antillean bullfinch, Melopyrrha violacea
