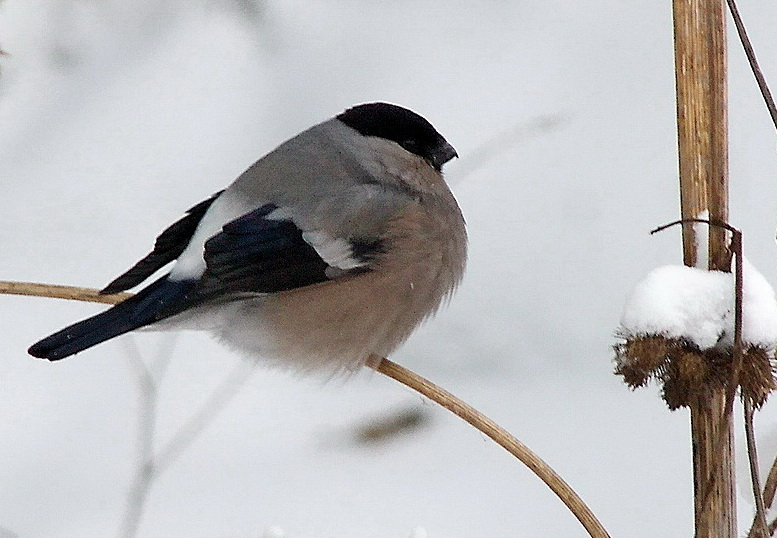
- In Russia

Scientific classification
- Kingdom: Animalia
- Phylum: Chordata
- Class: Aves
- Order: Passeriformes
- Family: Fringillidae
- Subfamily: Carduelinae
- Genus: Pyrrhula
- Species: P. pyrrhula
- Subspecies: P. p. cineracea

Trinomial name
- Pyrrhula pyrrhula cineracea Cabanis 1872

Synonyms
- Pyrrhula cineracea

= Baikal bullfinch =

Subspecies of bird

The Baikal bullfinch (Pyrrhula pyrrhula cineracea), also known as the grey bullfinch, grey-headed bullfinch or great bullfinch, is a small passerine bird in the finch family Fringillidae. It is found in eastern Kazakhstan, Mongolia and adjacent areas of Russia and China. Although sometimes considered a full species (Pyrrhula cineracea), most authorities treat it a subspecies of the Eurasian bullfinch. It migrates altitudinally from its summer breeding range in the Altai Mountains to its winter range in the adjacent foothills and plains.

== Description ==
The male differs from that of the nominate subspecies by having completely grey underparts.

== Distribution and habitat ==
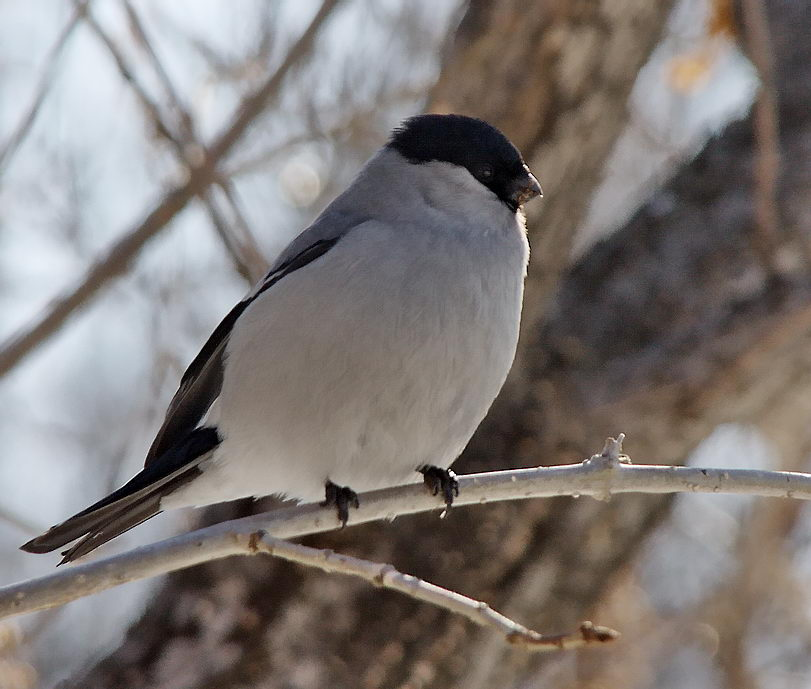
In Russia

In Kazakhstan the Baikal bullfinch is a rare resident and common winter visitor. It breeds in the western Altai Mountains, including the Belaya Uba valley, and the Sayan Mountains (eastern Altai) of western Mongolia; in the southern Altai it breeds in the upper reaches of the Bukhtarma River, around Lake Markakol, and in the Kara-Kaba valley (where it intergrades with the nominate subspecies). On post-breeding dispersal and in winter, it occurs mainly in the foothills and plains of eastern Kazakhstan, sometimes as far west as Semipalatinsk, Kurgaldzhino Reserve and Astana, Almaty, the Chu-Iliyskiye Mountains and at Kyzylorda in the Syr Darya valley.

The Baikal bullfinch inhabits fir forests with some deciduous trees, fir-larch and spruce-birch forest in river valleys and lake shores at altitudes of 1,400–1,800 m. On dispersal, the Baikal bullfinches visit deciduous forests with a shrubby understorey, riparian forests and thickets of tall weeds.

== Behaviour ==
=== Breeding ===
The birds breed in the Altai from May, with scattered pairs nesting some distance from one another. A nest recorded in early May in a birch tree was built 5 m above the ground of thin twigs and dry grass lined with thin rootlets and hair. Fledglings and independent juvenile birds have been recorded from mid-July to early August. Dispersal from the breeding range begins in August and September, with birds appearing in southeastern Kazakhstan from the end of October to early November, and remaining there until mid-May.
