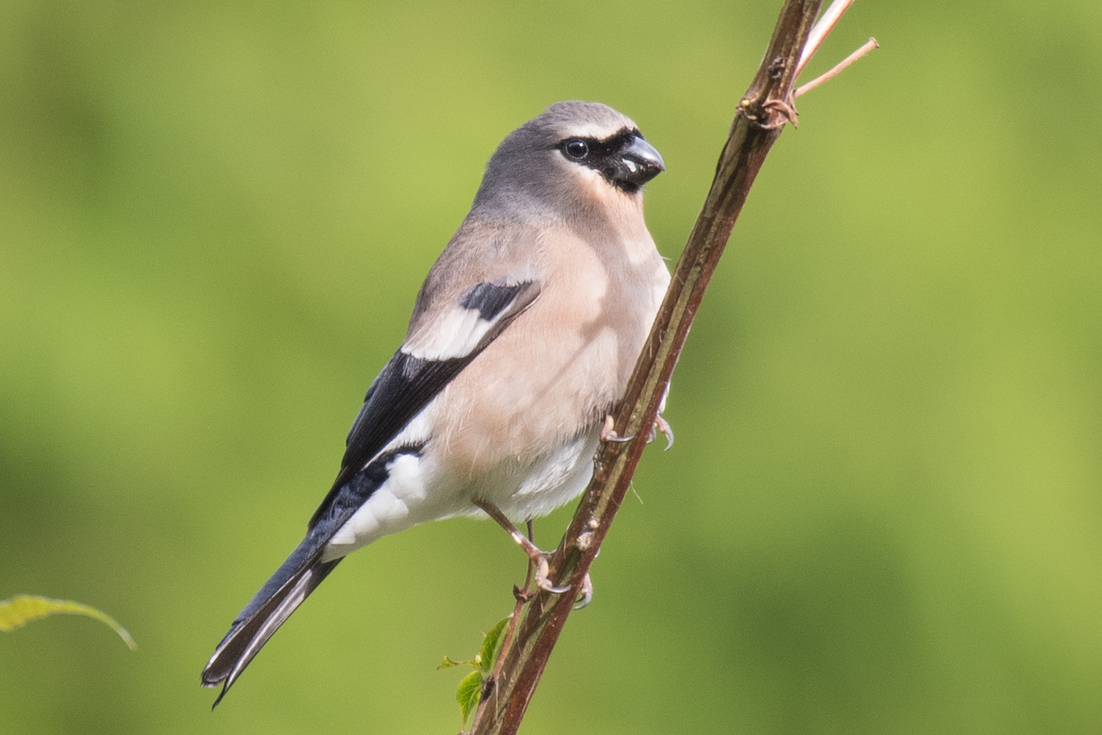

Scientific classification
- Kingdom: Animalia
- Phylum: Chordata
- Class: Aves
- Order: Passeriformes
- Family: Fringillidae
- Subfamily: Carduelinae
- Genus: Pyrrhula
- Species: P. owstoni

Binomial name
- Pyrrhula owstoni Rothschild & Hartert, 1907

Synonyms
- Pyrrhula erythaca owstoni

= Taiwan bullfinch =

Species of bird

The Taiwan bullfinch (Pyrrhula owstoni) is a species of finch in the family Fringillidae. It is endemic to the mountains of Taiwan. It was previously considered a subspecies of the grey-headed bullfinch (P. erythaca) and most authorities consider it as such, but a 2020 study found it to represent a distinct species that diverged from the mainland Asian P. erythaca during the mid-Pleistocene, and the International Ornithological Congress accepted it as such.
