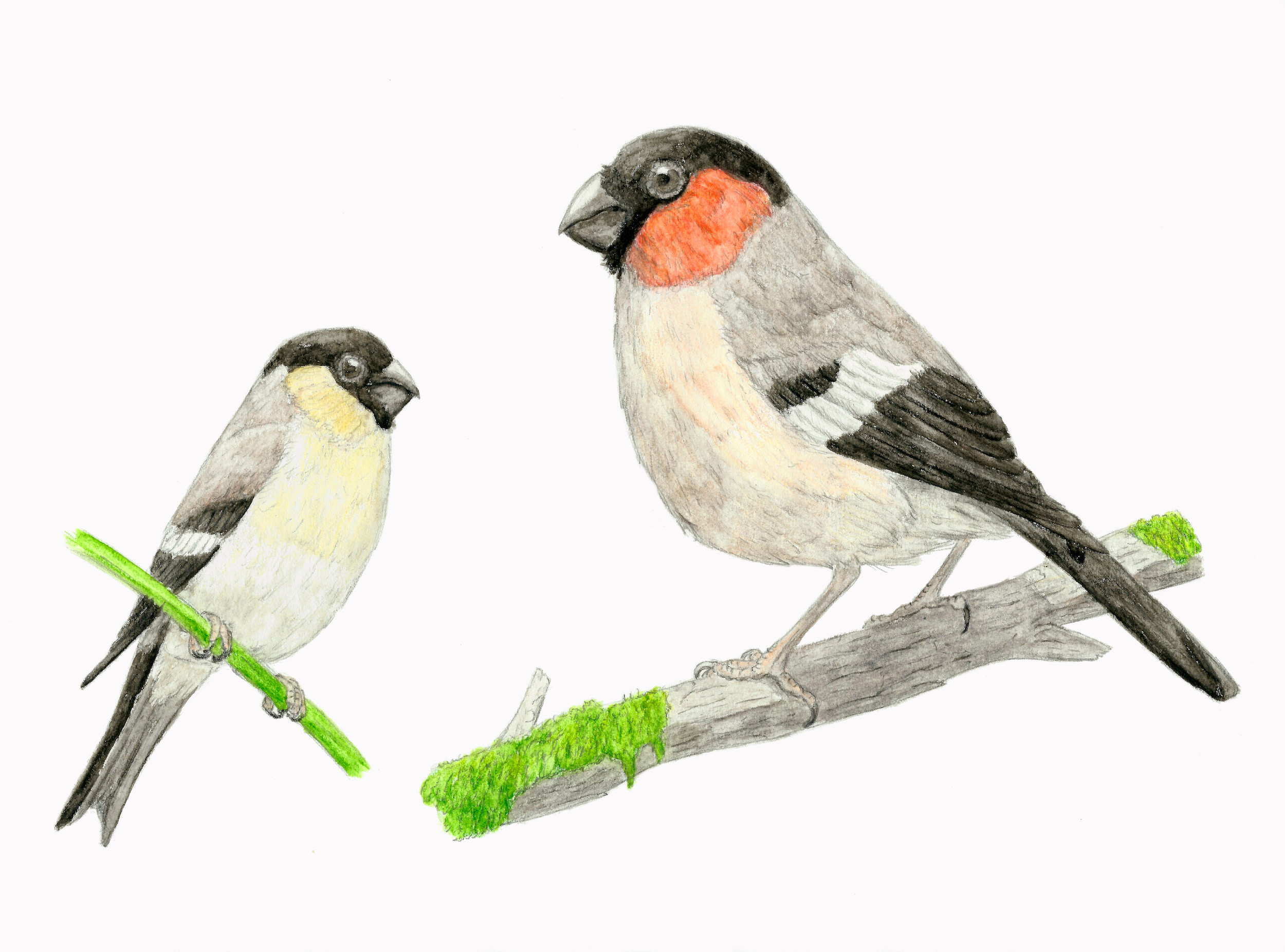
- P. crassa (right) next to its extant relative P. murina (left)

Conservation status
- Extinct

Scientific classification
- Kingdom: Animalia
- Phylum: Chordata
- Class: Aves
- Order: Passeriformes
- Family: Fringillidae
- Subfamily: Carduelinae
- Genus: Pyrrhula
- Species: †P. crassa

Binomial name
- †Pyrrhula crassa Rando et al, 2017

= Greater Azores bullfinch =

Greater Azores bullfinch Temporal range: Holocene

Extinct species of bird

The greater Azores bullfinch (Pyrrhula crassa) is an extinct species of large bullfinch in the family Fringillidae that was endemic to the Azores. It is the first known extinct passerine to be described from the islands. It is the largest known member of its genus based on its skull size, and had a very robust beak reminiscent of that of a parrot. However, the remains are otherwise reminiscent of the extant Azores bullfinch (Pyrrhula murina).

The species was described from subfossil remains found inside a lava tube in a volcano on Graciosa Island, although it may have inhabited other islands as well. The species was likely wiped out due to human settlement in the archipelago in the 15th century by the Portuguese, which led to habitat destruction and the introduction of invasive plant species, both of which depleted the laurel forest that P. crassa likely relied on.
