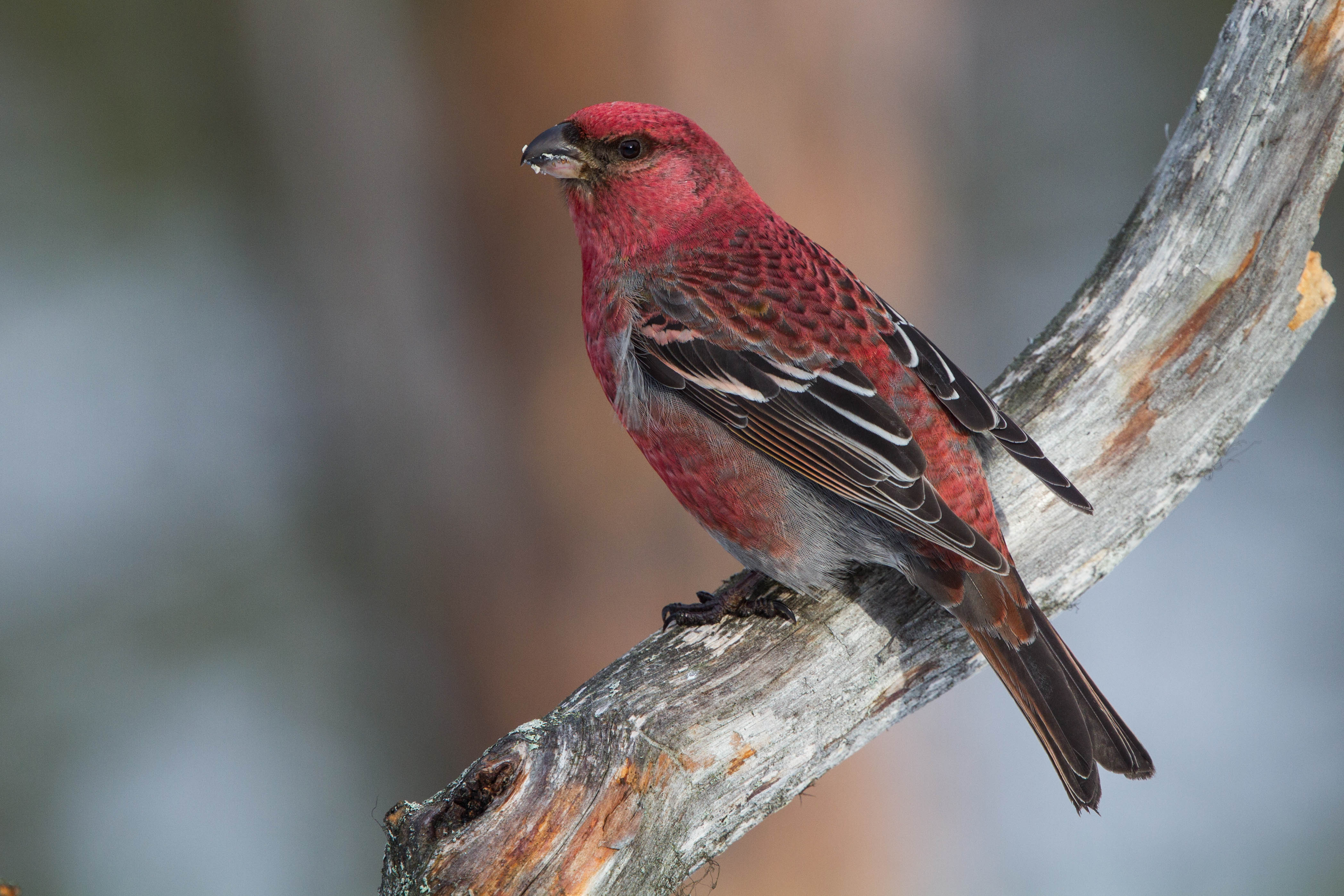
- Male P. e. enucleator
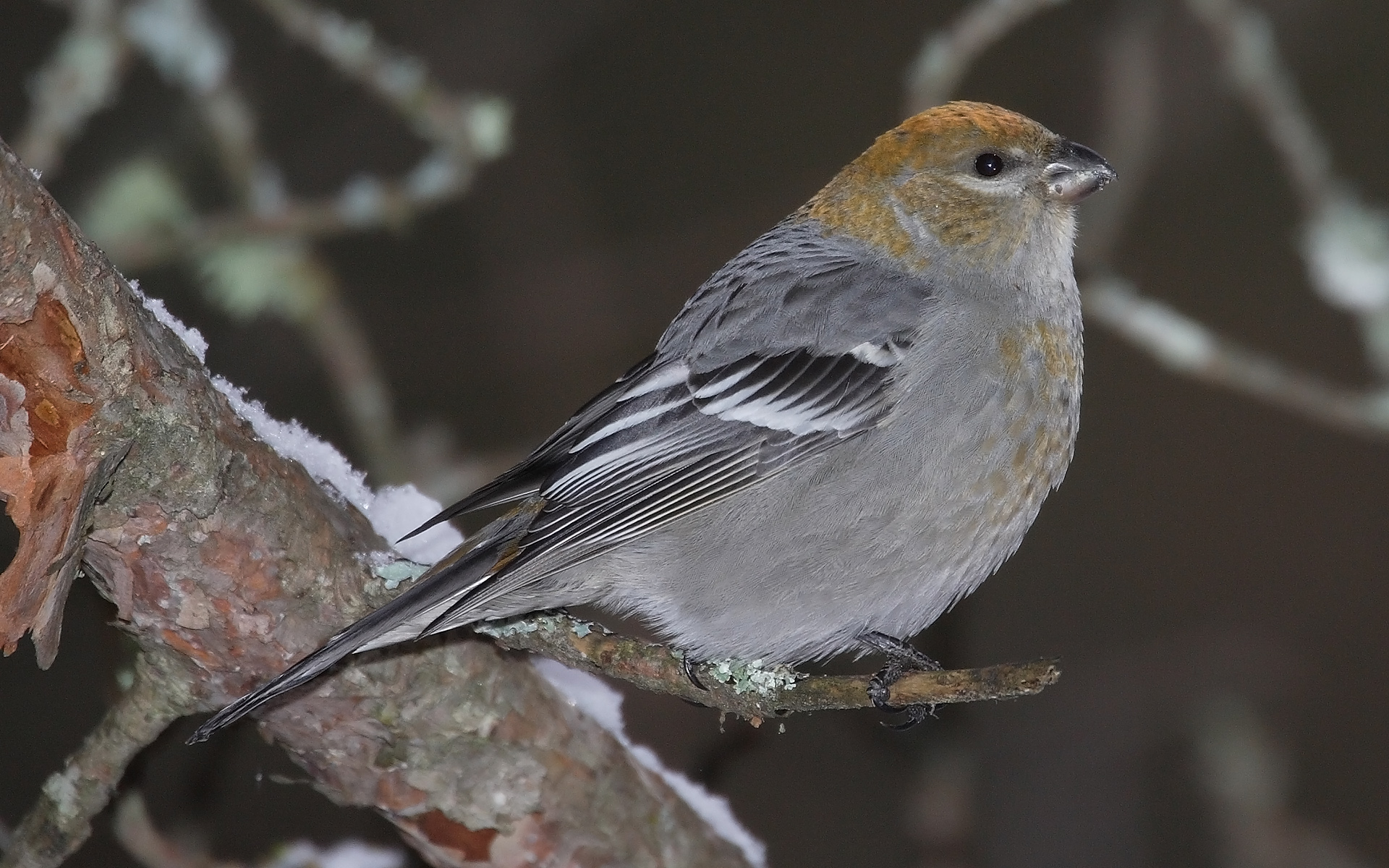
- Female in Canada

Conservation status
- Least Concern (IUCN 3.1)

Scientific classification
- Kingdom: Animalia
- Phylum: Chordata
- Class: Aves
- Order: Passeriformes
- Family: Fringillidae
- Subfamily: Carduelinae
- Genus: Pinicola; Vieillot, 1808
- Species: P. enucleator

Binomial name
- Pinicola enucleator (Linnaeus, 1758)
- Range of P. enucleator Resident Non-breeding

Synonyms
- Loxia enucleator Linnaeus, 1758

= Pine grosbeak =

Species of bird

The pine grosbeak (Pinicola enucleator) is a large member of the true finch family, Fringillidae. It is the only species in the genus Pinicola. It is found in coniferous woods across Alaska, the western mountains of the United States, Canada, and in subarctic Fennoscandia and across the Palearctic to Siberia. The species is a frugivore, especially in winter, favoring small fruits, such as rowans (mountain-ashes in the New World). With fruit-crop abundance varying from year to year, pine grosbeak is one of many subarctic-resident bird species that exhibit irruptive behavior. In irruption years, individuals can move long distances in search of suitable food supplies, bringing them farther south and/or downslope than is typical of years with large fruit crops.

== Taxonomy ==
The pine grosbeak was formally described in 1758 by the Swedish naturalist Carl Linnaeus in the tenth edition of his Systema Naturae under the binomial name Loxia enucleator. The type locality is Sweden. It is now the only species placed in the genus Pinicola that was erected in 1808 by the French ornithologist Louis Pierre Vieillot. The generic name Pinicola combines the Latin pinus meaning "pine tree" and colere meaning "to dwell"; the specific enucleator is from the Latin enucleare meaning "to remove the kernel".

The pine grosbeak is a sister taxon to the bullfinches of the genus Pyrrhula. The crimson-browed finch (Carpodacus subhimachalus) was previously placed in the genus Pinicola. It was moved to the rosefinch genus Carpodacus based on results from phylogenetic studies of mitochondrial and nuclear DNA sequences that were published in 2012 and 2013.

Eight subspecies are recognised:

- P. e. enucleator (Linnaeus, 1758) – Scandinavia to central Siberia
- P. e. kamtschatkensis (Dybowski, 1883) – northeastern Siberia
- P. e. sakhalinensis Buturlin, 1915 – Sakhalin and the Kuril Islands, northern Japan
- P. e. flammula Homeyer, 1880 – coastal southern Alaska and western Canada
- P. e. carlottae Brooks, AC, 1922 – the Queen Charlotte Islands (off western Canada)
- P. e. montana Ridgway, 1898 – inland southwestern Canada to west-central U.S.
- P. e. californica Price, 1897 – eastern California
- P. e. leucura (Müller, PLS, 1776) – inland west, central Alaska to eastern Canada and northern New England (U.S.)

== Description ==
This species is one of the largest species in the true finch family. It measures from 20 to 25.5 cm (7.9 to 10.0 in) in length and weighs from 52 to 78 g (1.8 to 2.8 oz), with an average mass of 56.4 g (1.99 oz). The pine grosbeak's wingspan is 13.0 in (33 cm). Among standard measurements, the wing chord is 10.2 to 11.6 cm (4.0 to 4.6 in), the tail is 7.8 to 9.5 cm (3.1 to 3.7 in), the bill is 1.4 to 1.65 cm (0.55 to 0.65 in) and the tarsus is 1.9 to 2.3 cm (0.75 to 0.91 in). Adults have a long forked black tail, black wings with white wing bars and a large bill. Adult males have a rose-red head, back and rump, They also possess black wings and tail, with a conical beak. Adult females are olive-yellow on the head and rump and grey on the back and underparts. Young birds have a less contrasting plumage overall, appearing shaggy when they moult their colored head plumage.

Its voice is geographically variable, and includes a whistled pui pui pui or chii-vli. The song is a short musical warble.

== Distribution and habitat ==
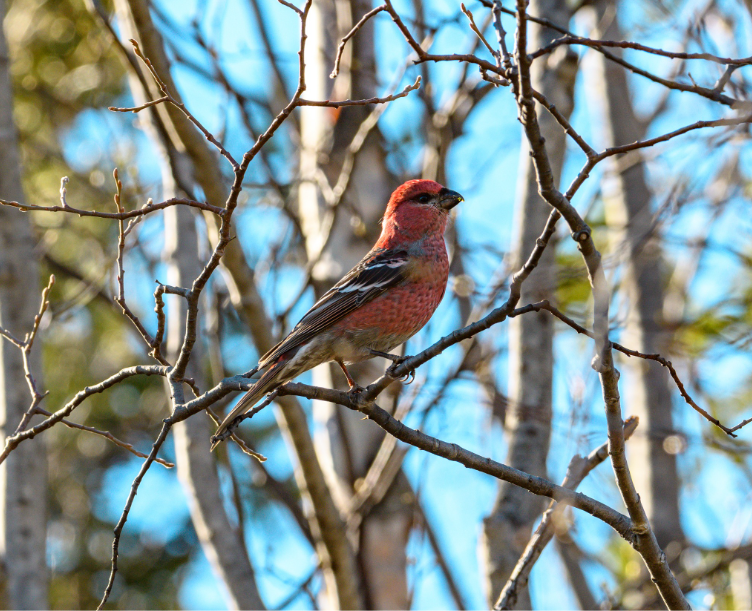
P. e. flammula Kenai National Wildlife Refuge, Alaska

Pine grosbeaks breed in the boreal forests of northern Eurasia and North America, and typically either remain resident near their breeding grounds or migrate relatively short distances to the southern extent of boreal forests. During irruptive years, more travel to southern boreal forests and some move further south. In such years in the New World, they can occur well south of their typical winter distribution, which is the northern Great Lakes region and northern New England in the United States. This species is a very rare vagrant to temperate parts of Europe; in all of Germany, for example, not more than 4 individuals per year and often none at all have been recorded since 1980. The birds have also been known to live in coniferous forests, and other woodlands of the sort.

== Behaviour and ecology ==
The breeding habitat of the pine grosbeak is coniferous forests. They nest on a horizontal branch or in a fork of a conifer. This bird is a permanent resident through most of its range; in the extreme north or when food sources are scarce, they may migrate farther south. When breeding both sexes develop gular pouches which they use to store seeds before feeding them to the young.

Pine grosbeaks forage in trees and bushes. They mainly eat seeds, buds, berries, and insects. Outside of the nesting season, they often feed in flocks.

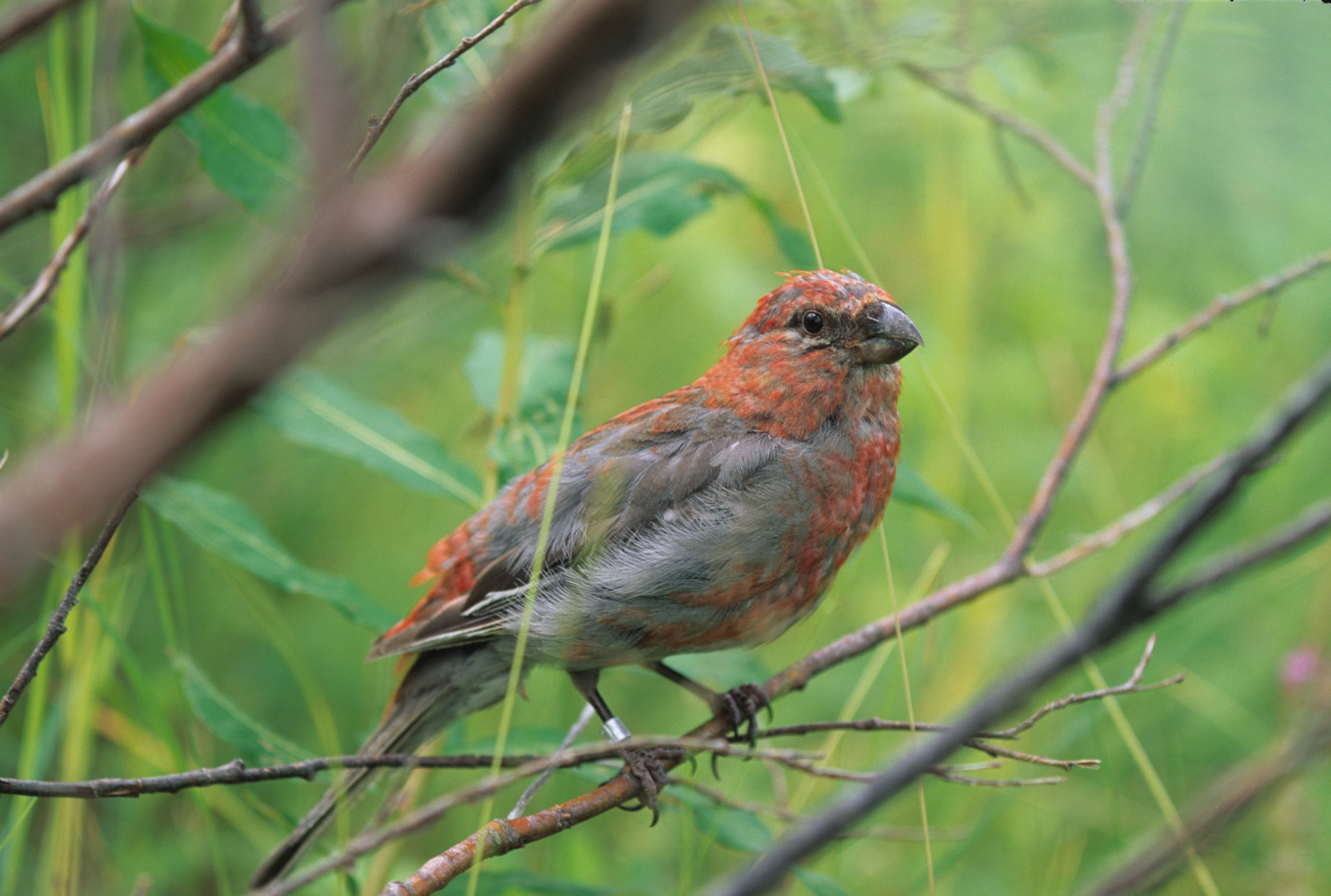
P. e. flammula, moulting immature male

P. e. montana, immature male

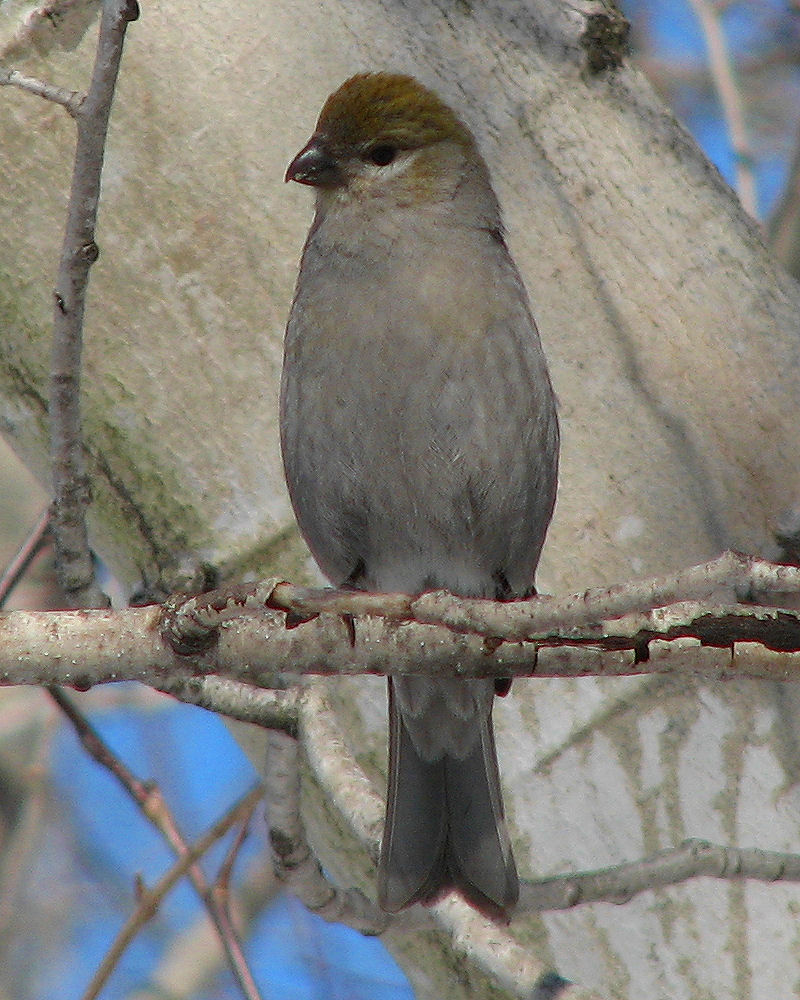
Front view of female, notice forked tail, Gatineau Park, Quebec

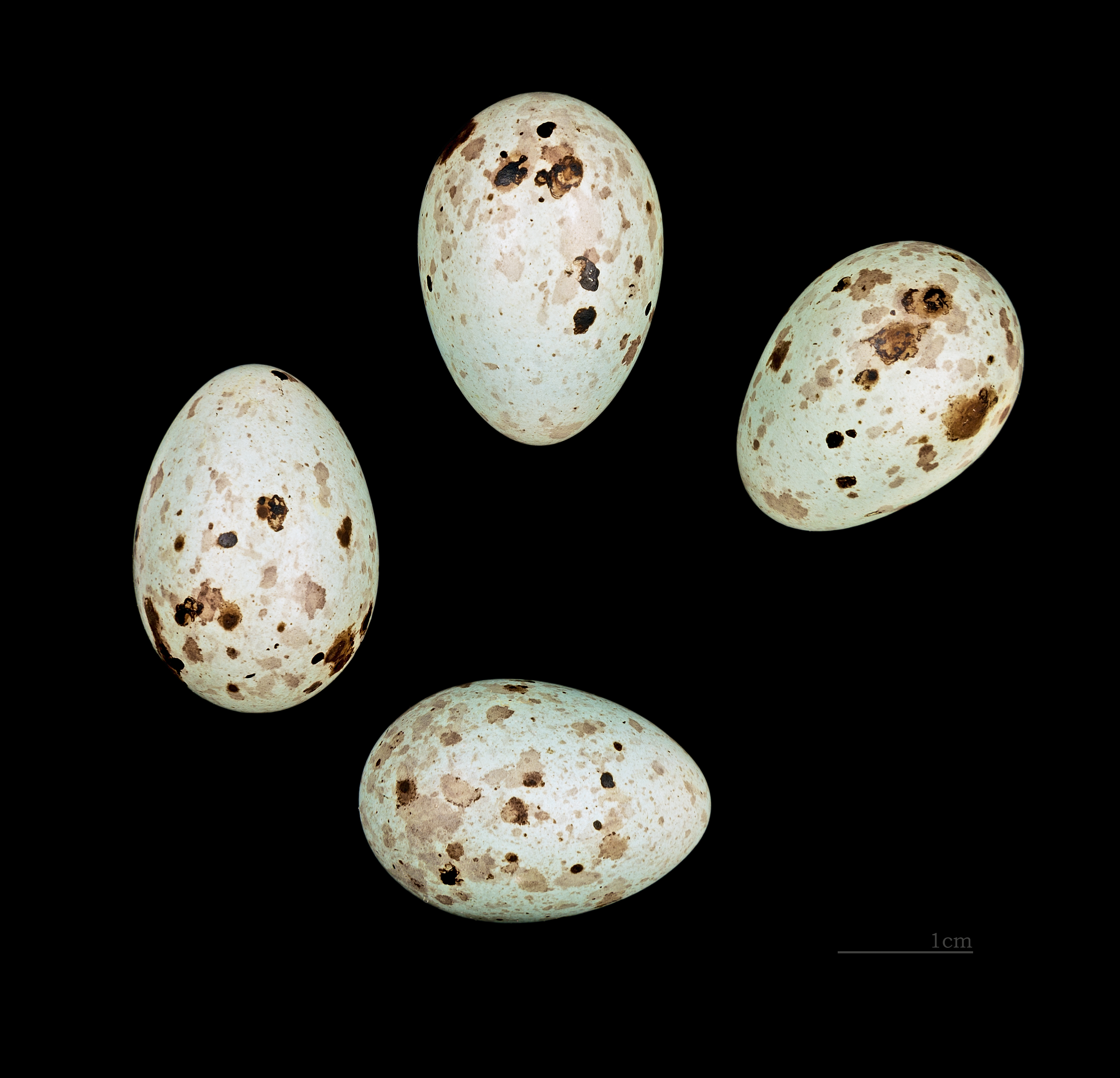
Eggs of Pinicola enucleator MHNT
