= Pico da Vara =

Mountain in Portugal

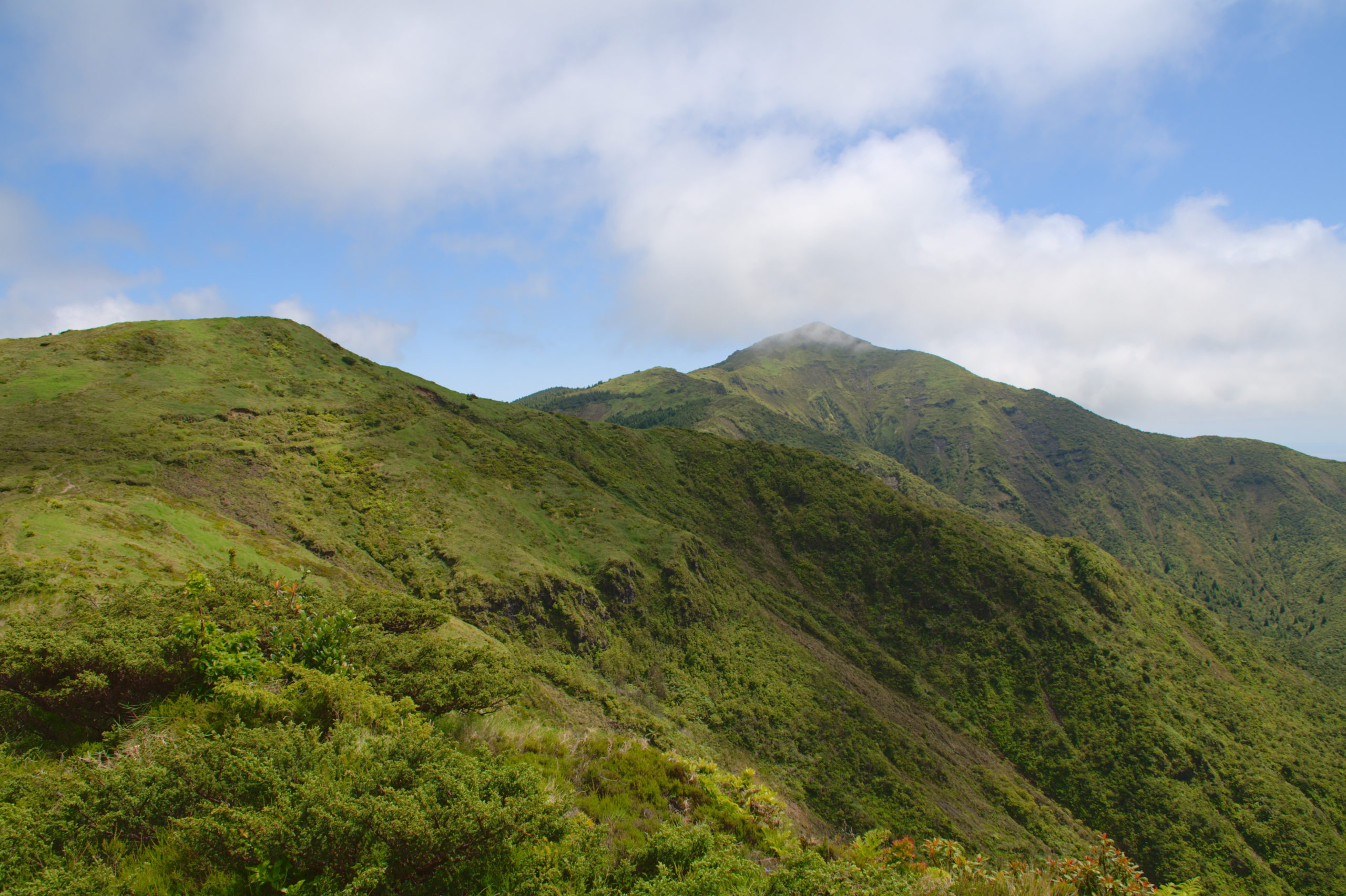

Highest point
- Elevation: 1,105 m (3,625 ft)
- Prominence: 1,105 m (3,625 ft)
- Listing: Ribu
- Coordinates: 37°48′35.6″N 25°12′40″W

Geography
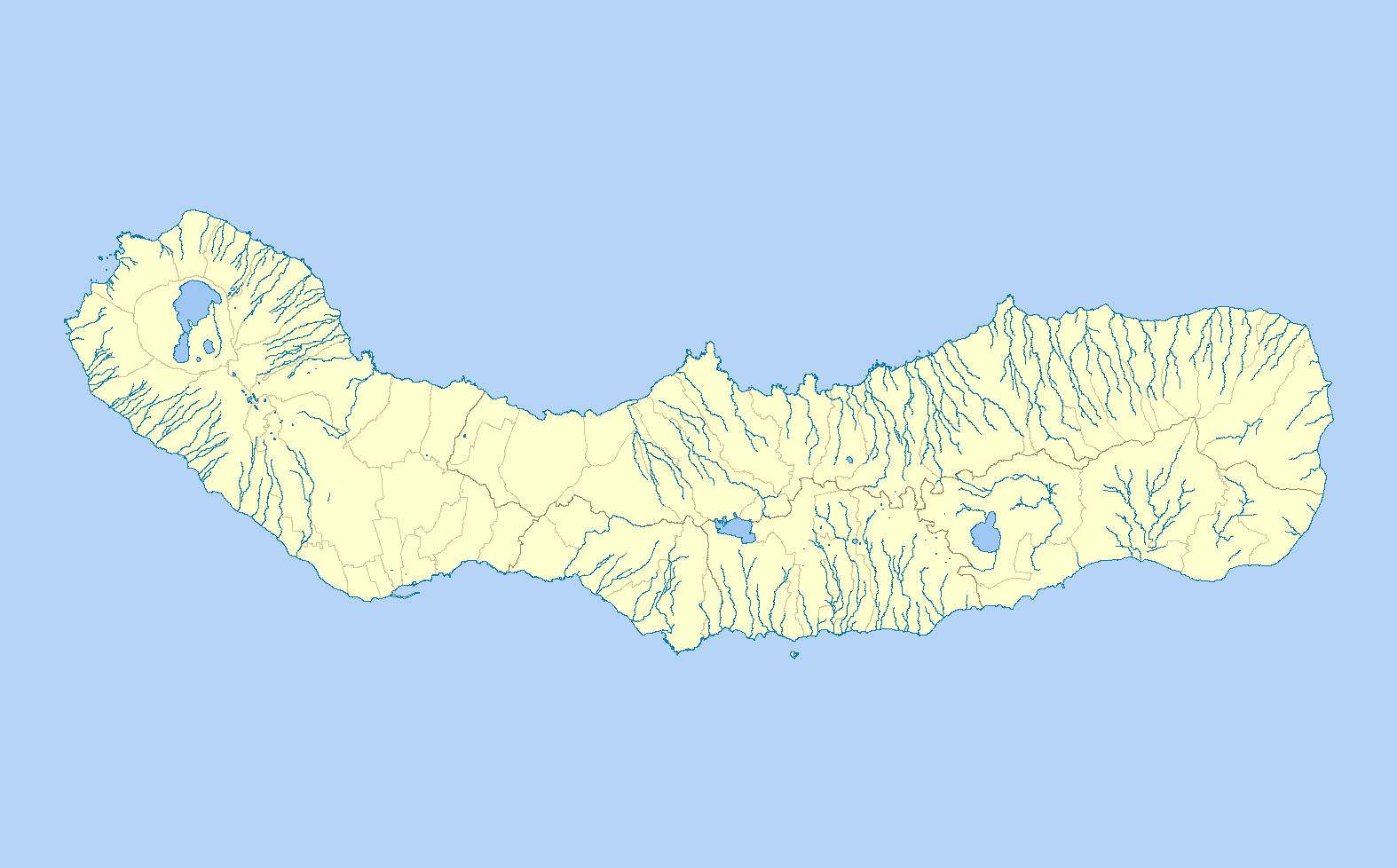
- Location within São Miguel
- Location: São Miguel Island, Azores, Portugal

Pico da Vara is the highest mountain on the island of São Miguel, in the Portuguese archipelago of the Azores, and principal special protection of the Nature Reserve of Pico da Vara. The area around the mountain includes the largest remaining stand of the native laurisilva forest on the island, home to the vulnerable endemic Azores bullfinch.

== Geography ==
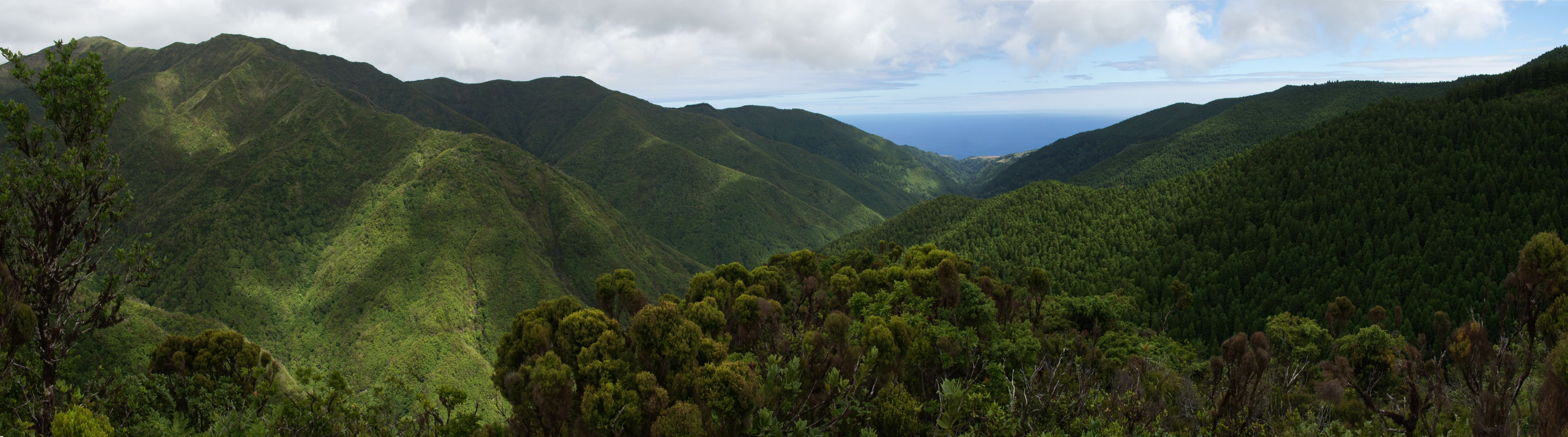
The mountainous range of the Serra da Tronqueira and Pico da Vara

The mountain lies in the eastern part of the island, in the Serra da Tronqueira range, within the confluence of the municipalities of Nordeste and Povoação.

The nature reserve begins a dirt road that connects the region to the plateau of the Graminhais to Pico da Vara, in an area that the road intersects para of the Ribeira do Purgar. The border inflects towards the northwest, passing to an area 947 metres (3,107 ft), until the 900 metres (3,000 ft) isoline, then continues to the east until the pedestrian trail from Malhada, where it heads north to Grota Escura. From this grotto it descends until the Ribeira do Guilherme, inflecting to the south to another grotto that separates the spikes of Francisco Pires e dos Bodes, until the roadway of Tronqueira. The border continues to the north until Serreta, descending later to the west again, until the roadway once again, following it until the crossroad of Grotinha do Pico Verde. Continuing on the valley west until the 775 metres (2,543 ft) isoline, it ascends until the 800 metres (2,600 ft) elevation until the ravine west of Pico Verde. The frontier descends the ravine until the 700 metres (2,300 ft) elevation, following a northerly trajectory terminating at the tributary of the Ribeira do Purgar.

Situated in the eastern part of the island of São Miguel, its relief is characteristically mountainous, cut by valleys that are fed by perennial and permanent ravines.

Access to this area and the mountain requires a special permit. This authorisation can be obtained through an online application form.

== Biome ==
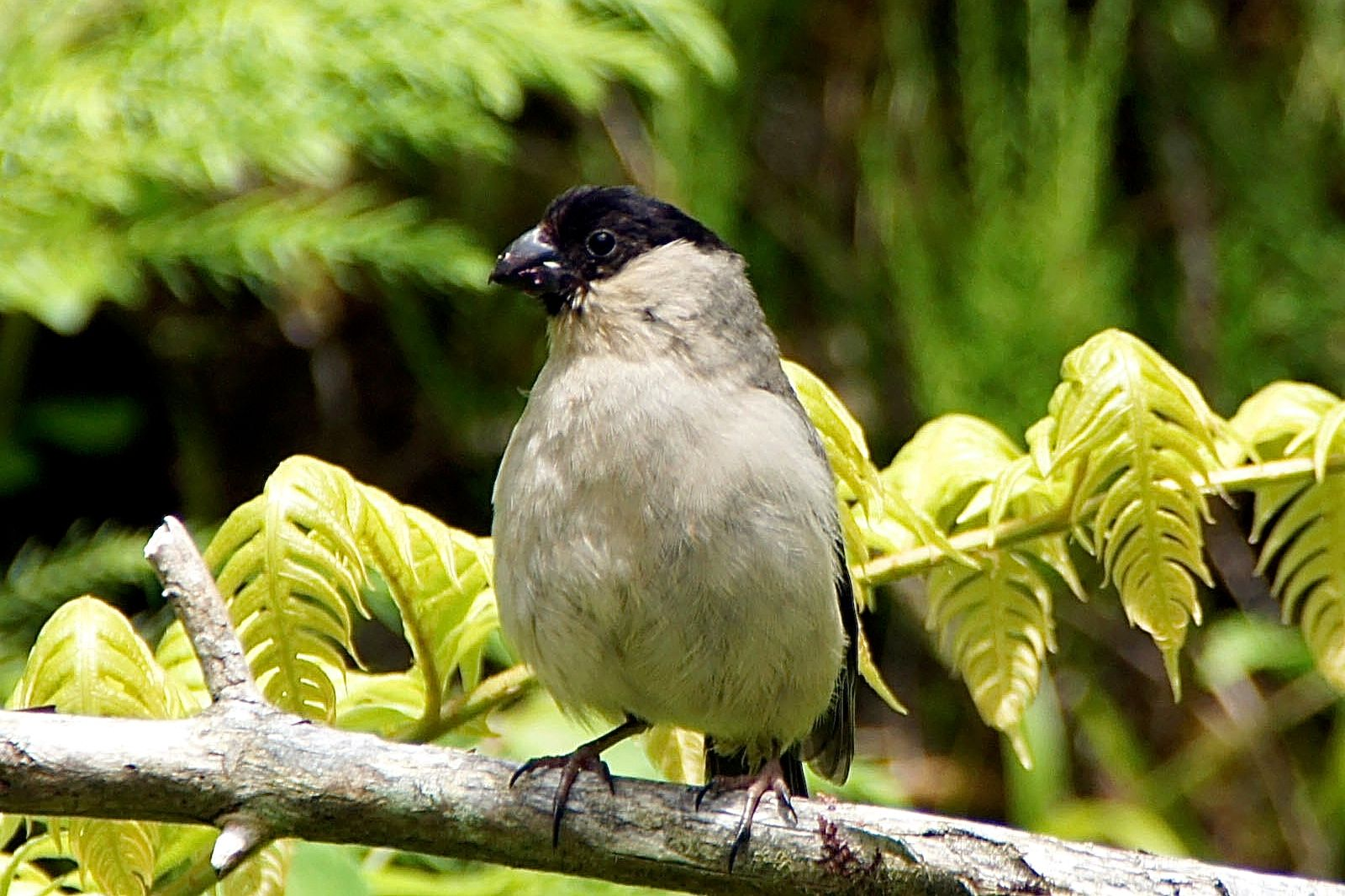
The rare, endemic and critically endangered Azores Bullfinch, whose habitat covers the Laurissilva forests of the Pico da Vara Nature Reserve

Pico da Vara is part of the Natura 2000 reserve, classified under the Birds Directive, as a special protection zone that includes 1,982 hectares (4,900 acres) of rich botanical and notable landscape environments. The region is primarily part of the Nature Reserve of Pico da Vara, an area that does not include the peak by the partial reserve of Graminhais, classified in 1988.

Vegetation in Pico da Vara is dominated by a dense forest of laurissilva, whose origins date to the humid forests of the Tertiary, existent in the south of Europe that dominated for millions of years until the onset of glaciation. The forests of Pico da Vara have an elevated level of endemic species, including shrub plants, large fennel and dense ferns. These include Madeiran holly (Ilex perado), Azorean holly (Ilex azorica), flowering laurel (Viburnum treleasei), Azores juniper (Juniperus brevifolia), Azores laurel (Laurus azorica), Portugal laurel (Prunus lusitanica), Azorean laurel (Prunus azorica), woolly tree fern (Culcita macrocarpa), Azores blueberry (Vaccinium cylindraceum) and a wood rush (Luzula purpureo-splendens).

Fauna is these forests and shrublands include rare terrestrial birds, such as the Azores bullfinch (Pyrrhula murina), endemic to the Azores, whose refuge is confined primarily to the existent laurissilva forests of Pico da Vara. This rare bird is considered at risk for extinction. In addition to the bullfinch, the zone is habitat for Azores chaffinch (Fringilla coelebs moreletti), common buzzard (Buteo buteo rothschild), Azores wood pigeon (Columba palumbuz azorica) and the São Miguel goldcrest (Regulus regulus azoricus), among others.
