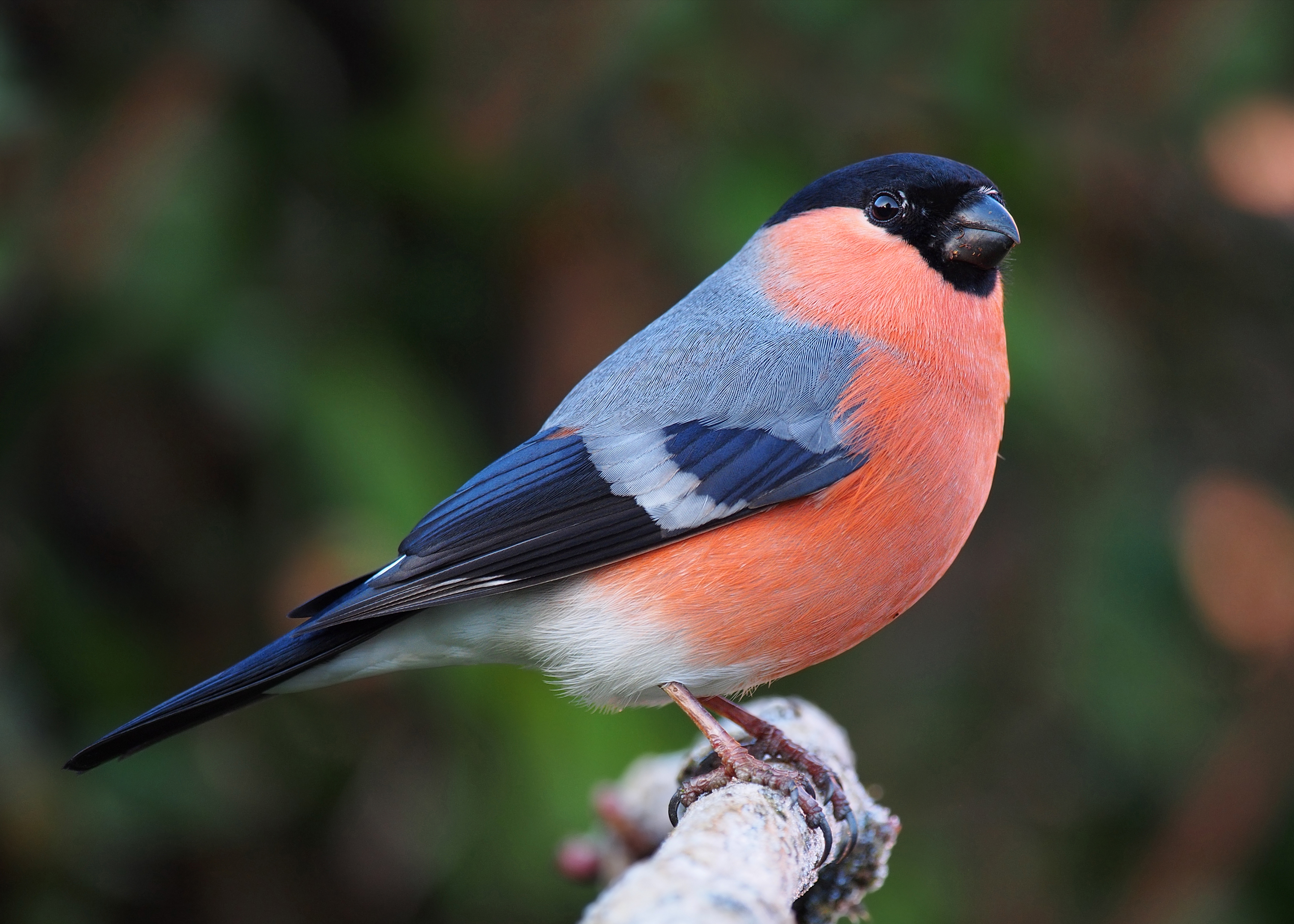
- Male in Lancashire, UK
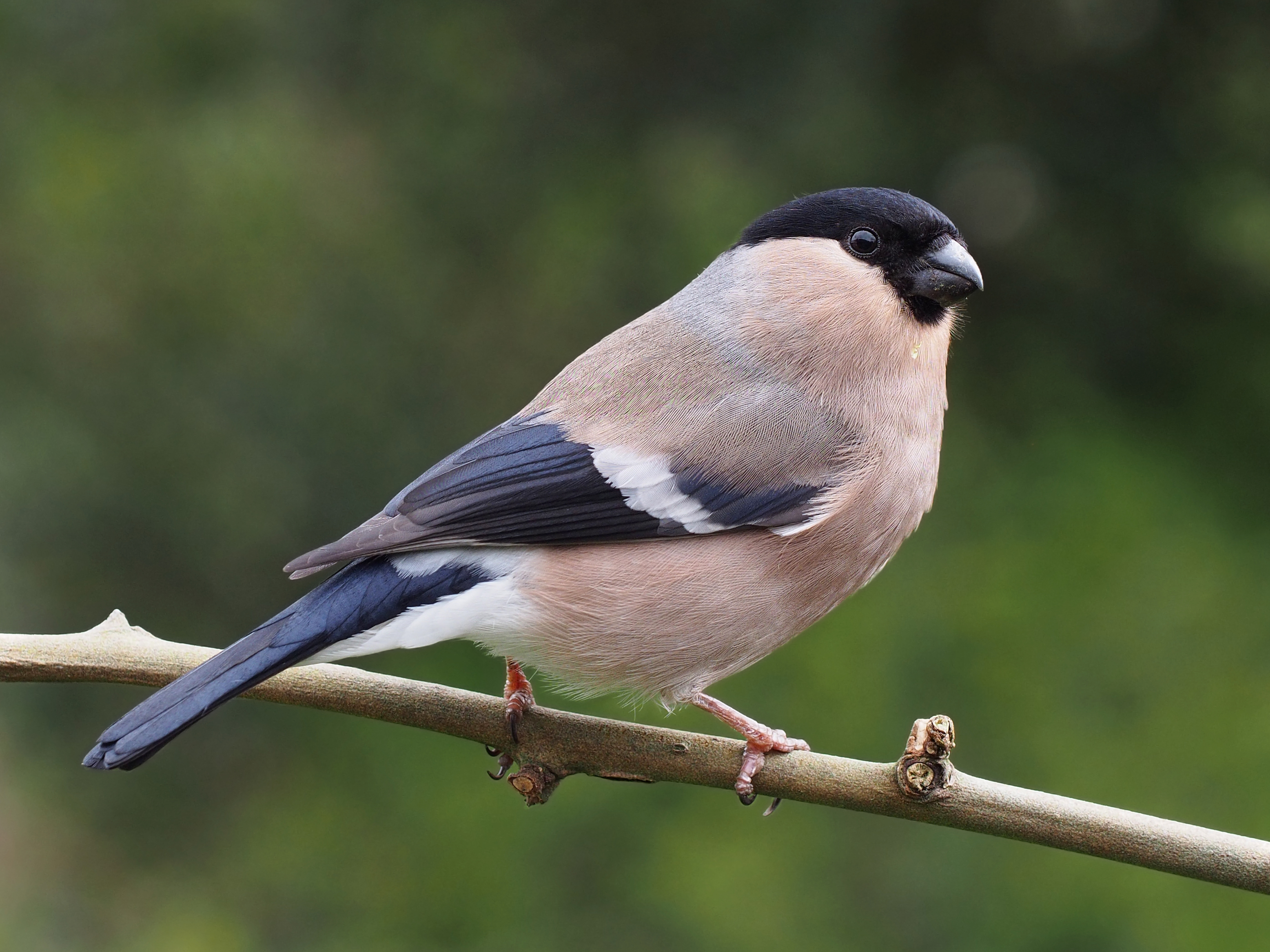
- Female in Lancashire, UK Song and calls recorded in Surrey, England

Conservation status
- Least Concern (IUCN 3.1)

Scientific classification
- Kingdom: Animalia
- Phylum: Chordata
- Class: Aves
- Order: Passeriformes
- Family: Fringillidae
- Subfamily: Carduelinae
- Genus: Pyrrhula
- Species: P. pyrrhula

Binomial name
- Pyrrhula pyrrhula (Linnaeus, 1758)
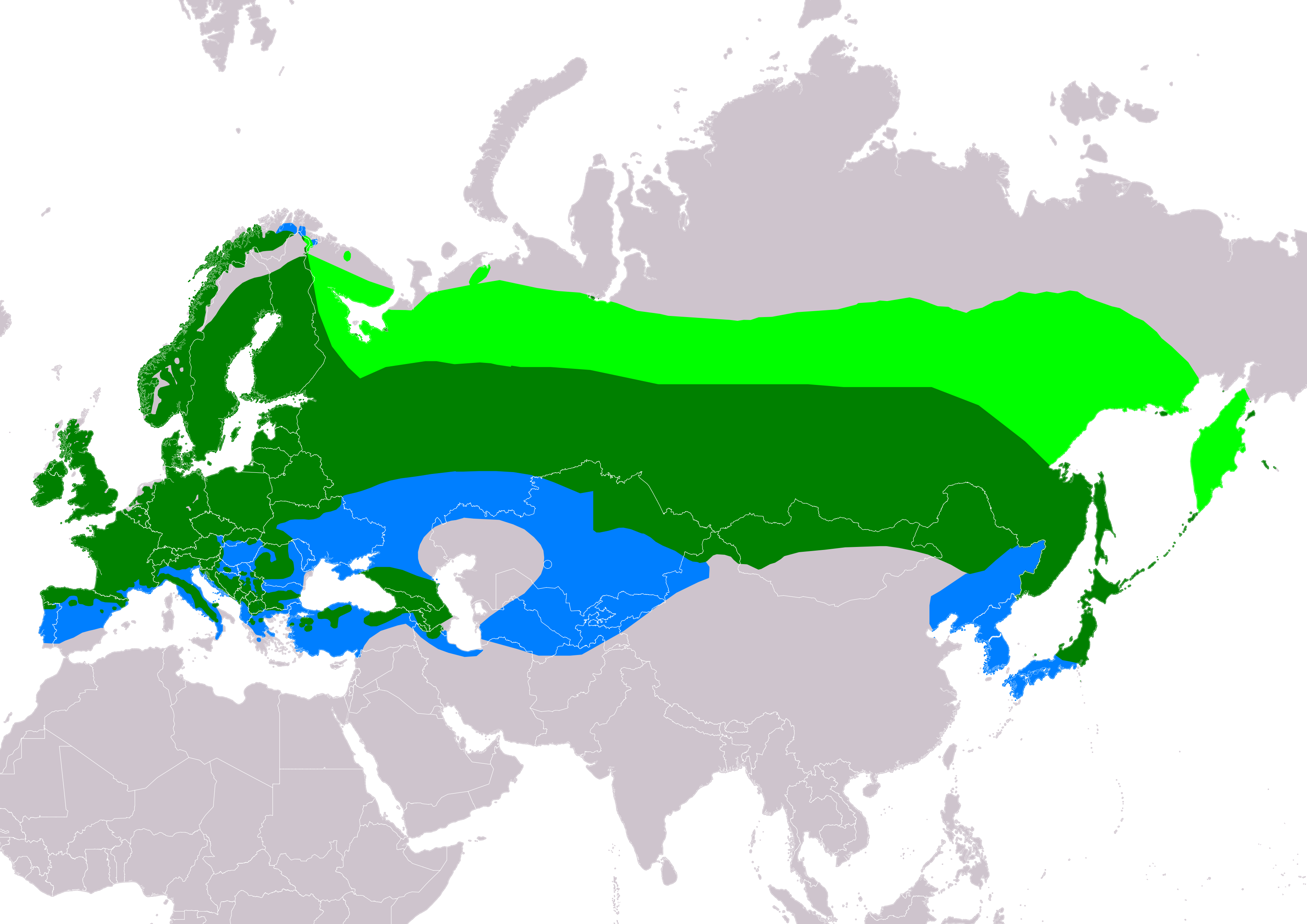
- Range of P. pyrrhula Breeding Resident Non-breeding

Synonyms
- Loxia pyrrhula Linnaeus, 1758

= Eurasian bullfinch =

Species of bird

The Eurasian bullfinch or common bullfinch (Pyrrhula pyrrhula) is a small passerine bird in the finch family, Fringillidae. In Anglophone Europe it is known simply as the bullfinch (English regional, Shropshire: plum bird), as it is the original bird to bear the name bullfinch.

== Taxonomy and systematics ==
The Eurasian bullfinch was formally described in 1758 by Linnaeus in the 10th edition of his Systema Naturae under the binomial name Loxia pyrrhula. It is now placed in the genus Pyrrhula that was introduced in 1760 by the French zoologist Mathurin Jacques Brisson. The Latin word pyrrhula comes from the Greek πυρρός (a flame-coloured bird, from πυρρός 'flame-coloured', from πυρ 'fire': Pyrrha), a 'worm eating bird' that is mentioned by Aristotle. The Latin name pyrrhula for the Eurasian bullfinch had been used in 1555 by the Swiss naturalist Conrad Gessner in his Historiae animalium.

=== Subspecies ===
Ten subspecies are recognised:

- P. p. pileata MacGillivray, W, 1837 – British Isles
- P. p. pyrrhula (Linnaeus, 1758) – north, south central and east Europe across to central Siberia
- P. p. europaea Vieillot, 1816 – Western Europe
- P. p. iberiae Voous, 1951 – southwest France, northern Iberian Peninsula
- P. p. rossikowi Derjugin & Bianchi, 1900 – northeast Turkey and the Caucasus
- P. p. cineracea Cabanis, 1872 (Baikal bullfinch) – west Siberia and northeast Kazakhstan to east Siberia and northeast China
- P. p. caspica Witherby, 1908 – Azerbaijan and north Iran
- P. p. cassinii Baird, SF, 1869 – east Siberia
- P. p. griseiventris Lafresnaye, 1841 (Grey-bellied bullfinch) – Kuril Islands and north Japan
- P. p. rosacea Seebohm, 1882 – Sakhalin (island north of Japan)

The Azores bullfinch (P. murina), previously regarded as a subspecies of the Eurasian bullfinch, is now recognised as a separate species.

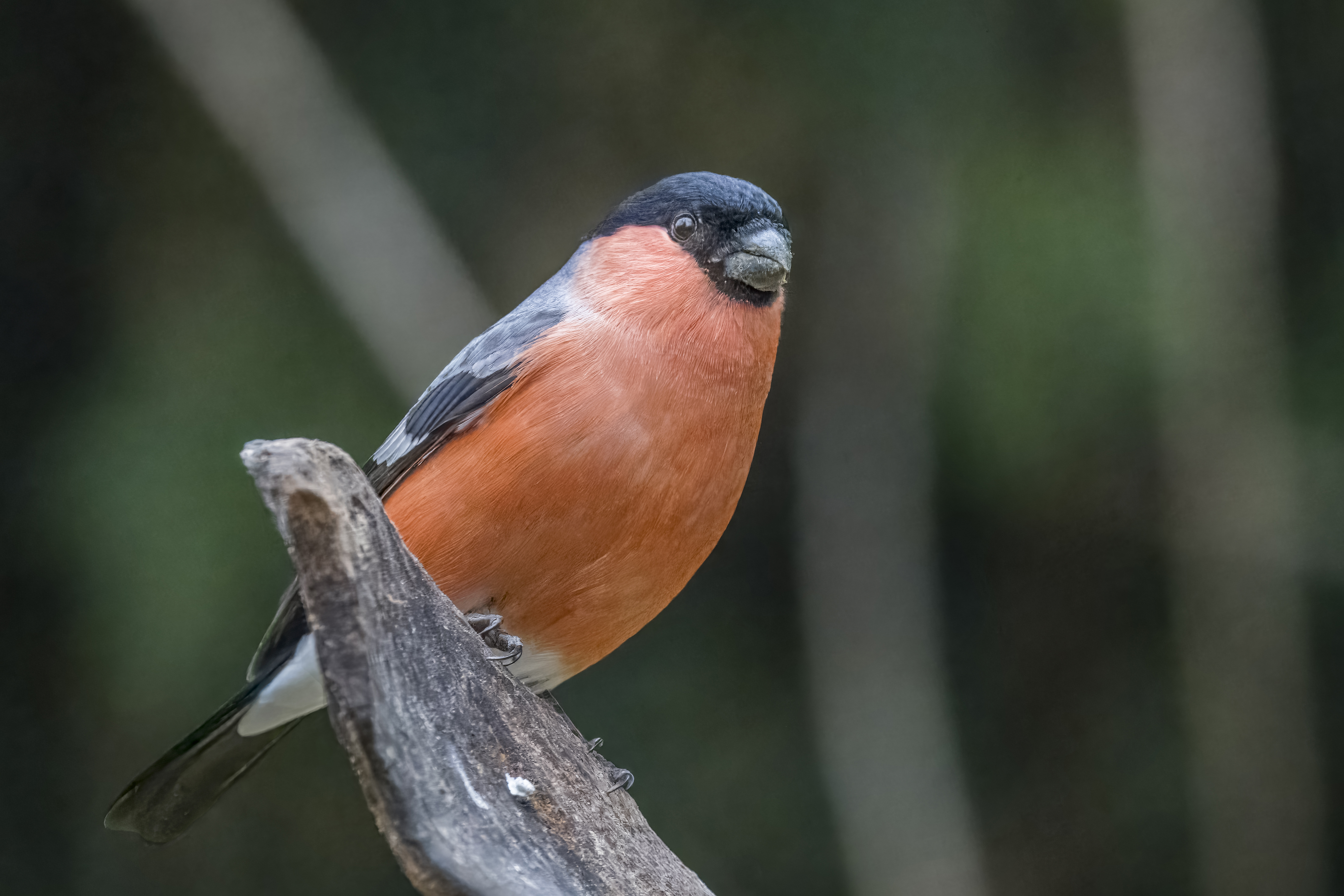
male P. p. europaea, Netherlands

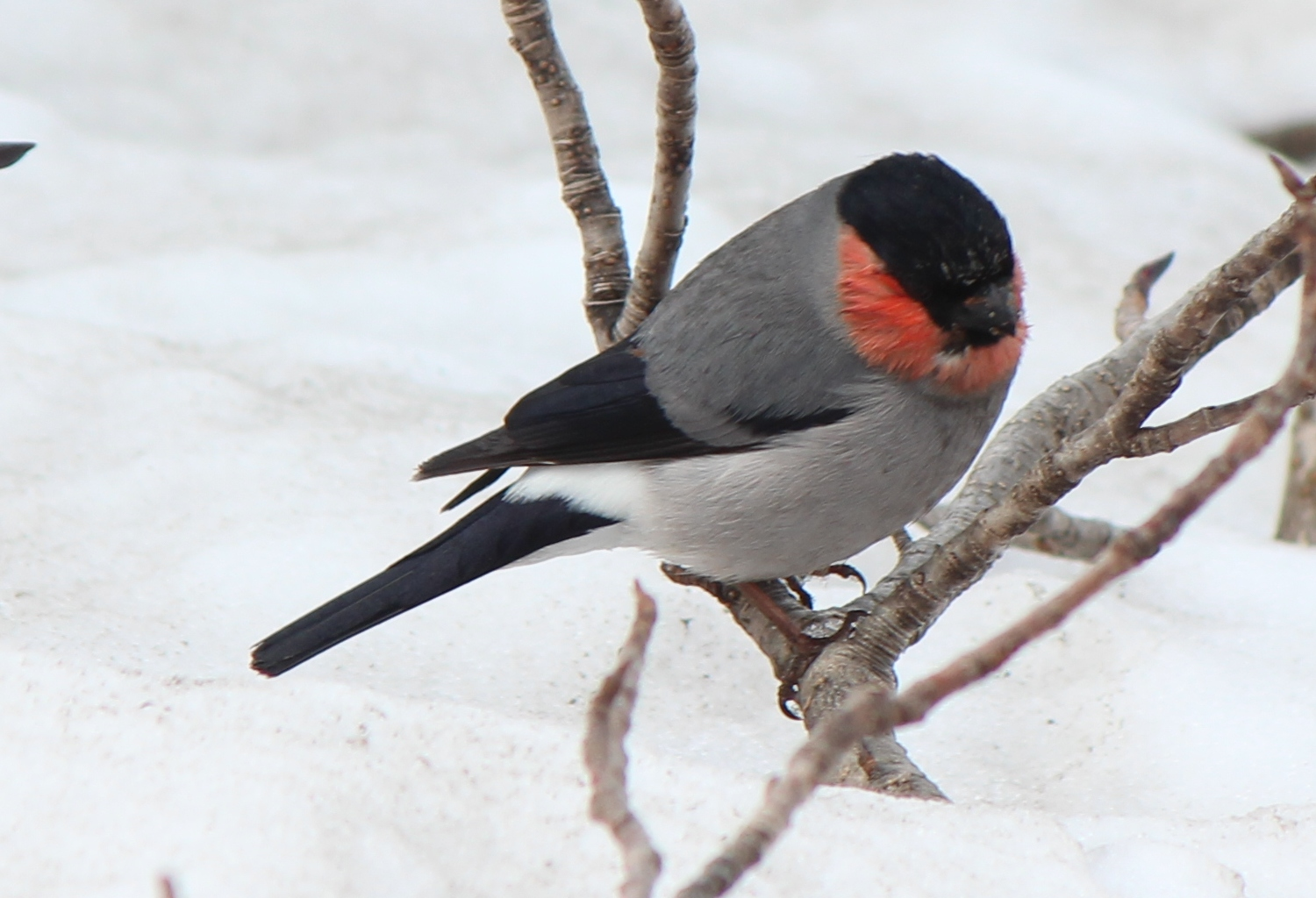
male P. p. griseiventris on Mount Haku, Japan, showing more grey in its plumage

== Description ==
The Eurasian bullfinch is a bulky bull-headed bird. The upper parts of its body are grey; the flight feathers and has a short stocky bill are black; as are the cap and face in adults (they are greyish-brown in juveniles), and the white rump and wing bars are striking in flight. The adult male has a distinctive rich red chest and underparts, but females and young birds have grey-buff feathers instead. It moults between July and October, but males do not have the duller autumn plumage that is typical of some other finches. The song of this unobtrusive bird contains fluted whistles, and is often described as "mournful". This bullfinch's usual call is a quiet, low, melancholy whistled peeu or pew. The song is audible only at close range. It is a weak, scratchy warbling, alternating with soft whistles. Tamed bullfinches can be taught to repeat specific melodies.

== Distribution and habitat ==
This bird breeds across most of Europe and temperate Asia. It is mainly resident, but many northern birds migrate further south in the winter. Mixed woodland with some conifers is favored for breeding, including parkland and gardens.

== Behaviour and ecology ==
This species does not form large flocks outside the breeding season, and is usually seen as a pair or family group.

=== Breeding ===
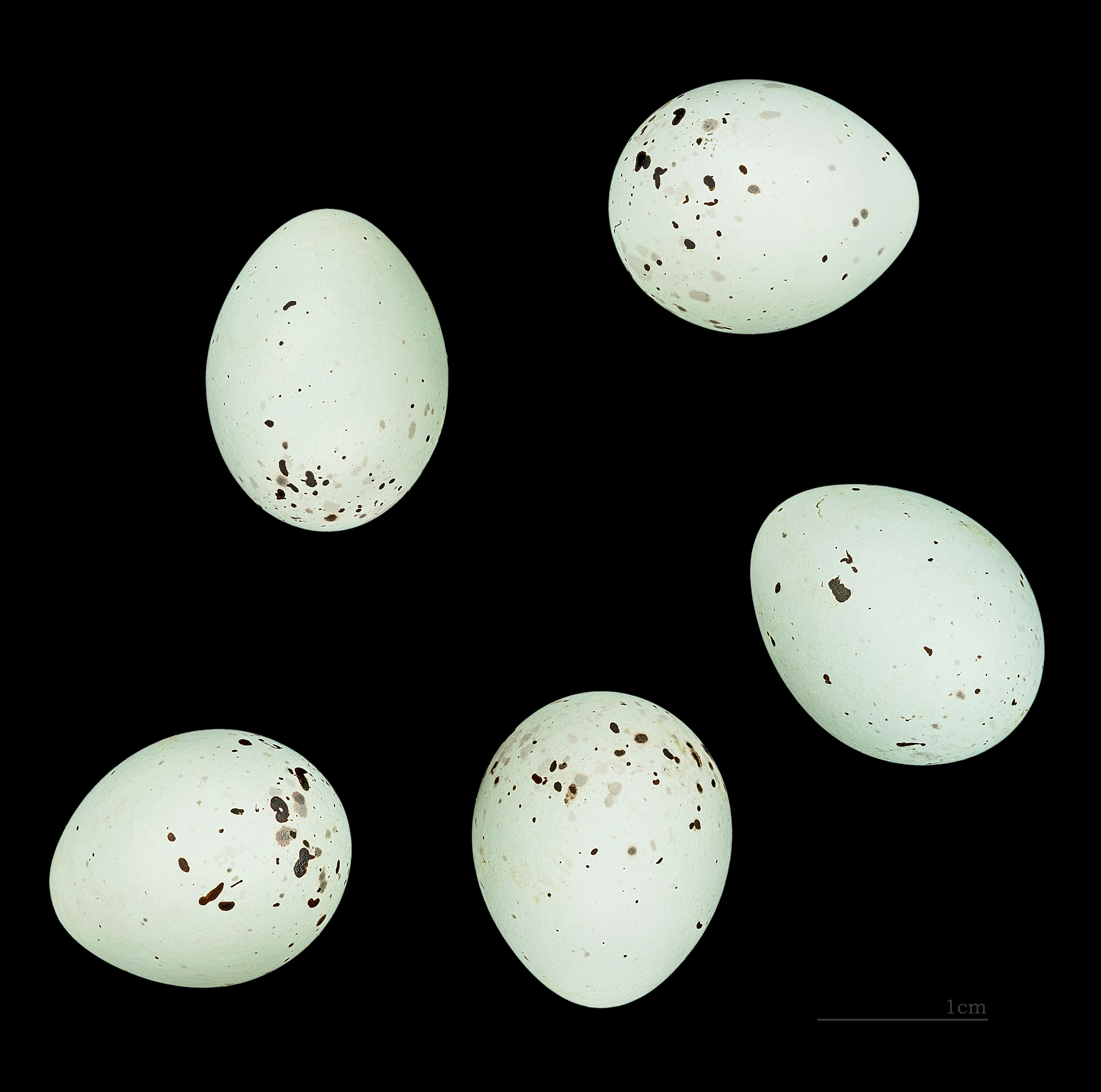
Eggs of P. pyrrhula europoea MHNT

It builds its nest in a bush, (preferably more than four metres tall and wide), mature stands of scrub, or tree, laying four to seven pale blue eggs which are mottled with red-brown. It is peculiar among the Passeriformes for having spermatozoa with a rounded head and a blunt acrosome. This species produces two or three broods per season, from early May to mid-July. Nesting success increases progressively from April–May to June–July and August.

== Food and feeding ==
Bullfinch and fruits of wild privet

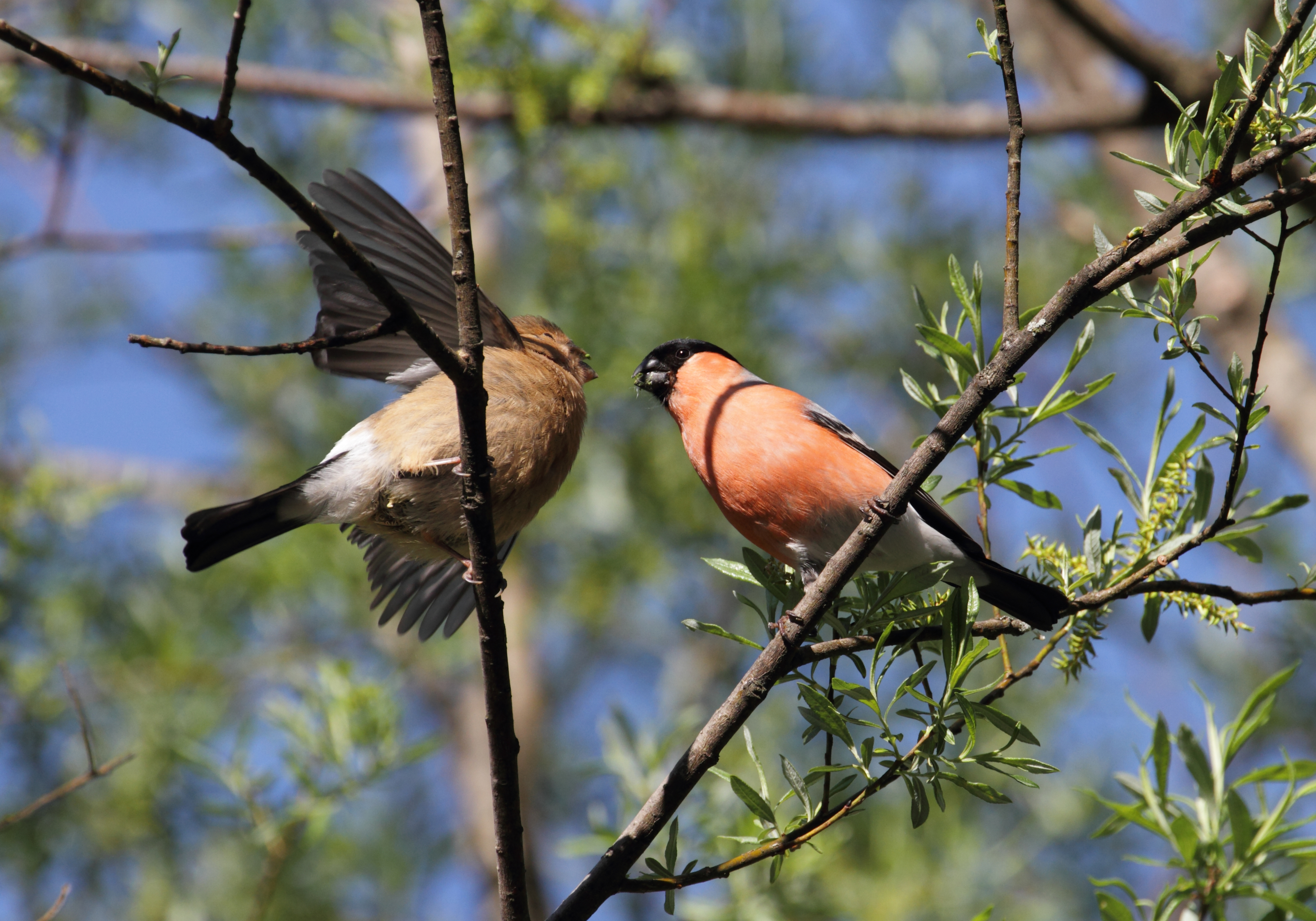
Male with young bird in Austria

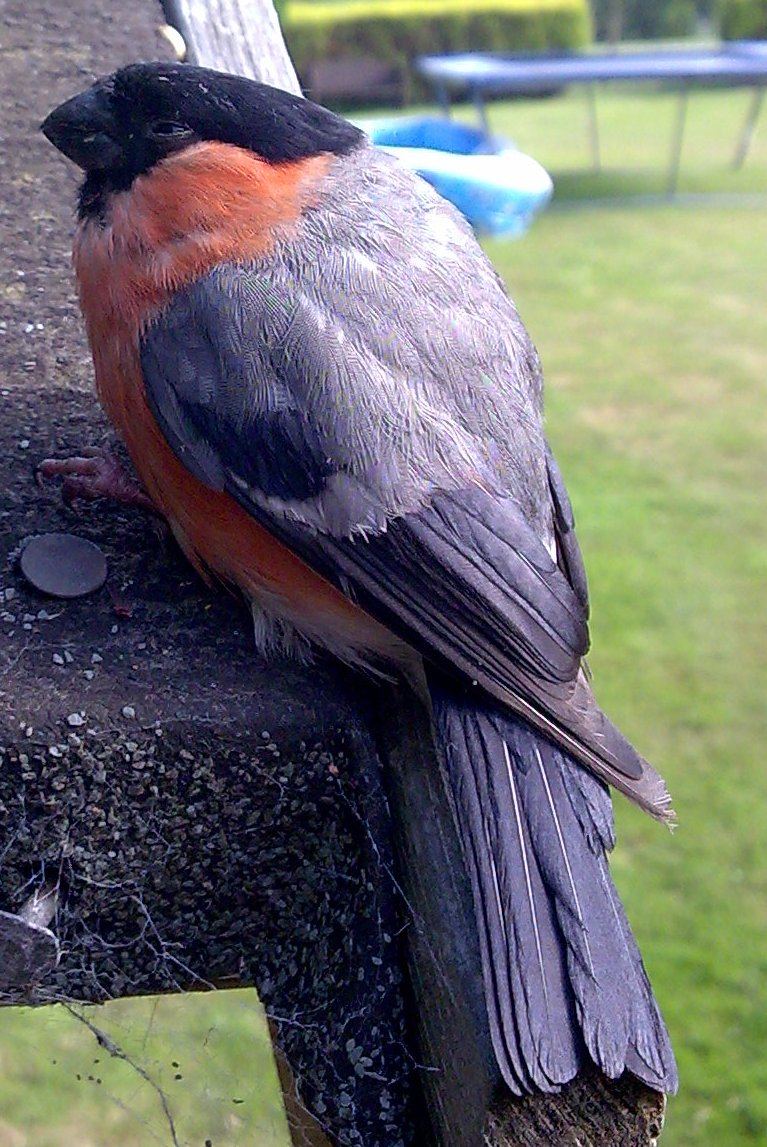
Young male in England

The food is mainly seeds and buds of fruit trees, which can make it a pest in orchards: in England, for centuries every parish paid a bounty for every bullfinch killed. Populations in the UK have declined since the 1970s due to loss of orchards and woodlands. Ash and hawthorn are favoured in autumn and early winter. If wild bird cover is planted for it, kale, quinoa and millet are preferred, next to tall hedges or woodland. Adults will feed chicks with invertebrates.
