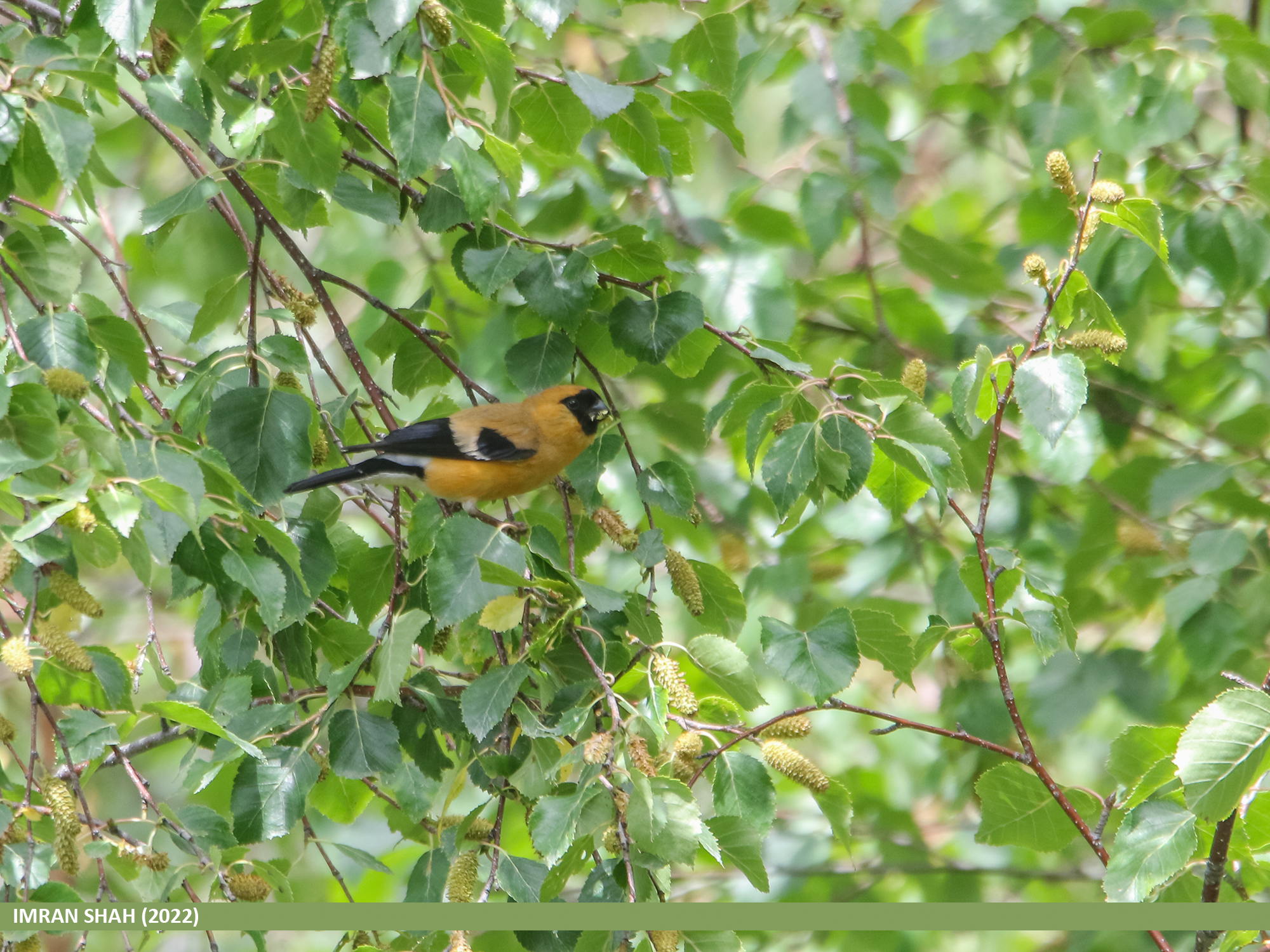

Conservation status
- Least Concern (IUCN 3.1)

Scientific classification
- Kingdom: Animalia
- Phylum: Chordata
- Class: Aves
- Order: Passeriformes
- Family: Fringillidae
- Subfamily: Carduelinae
- Genus: Pyrrhula
- Species: P. aurantiaca

Binomial name
- Pyrrhula aurantiaca Gould, 1858

= Orange bullfinch =

Species of bird

The orange bullfinch (Pyrrhula aurantiaca) is a species of finch in the family Fringillidae. It is native to northern India and Pakistan. Its natural habitat is temperate montane forest.

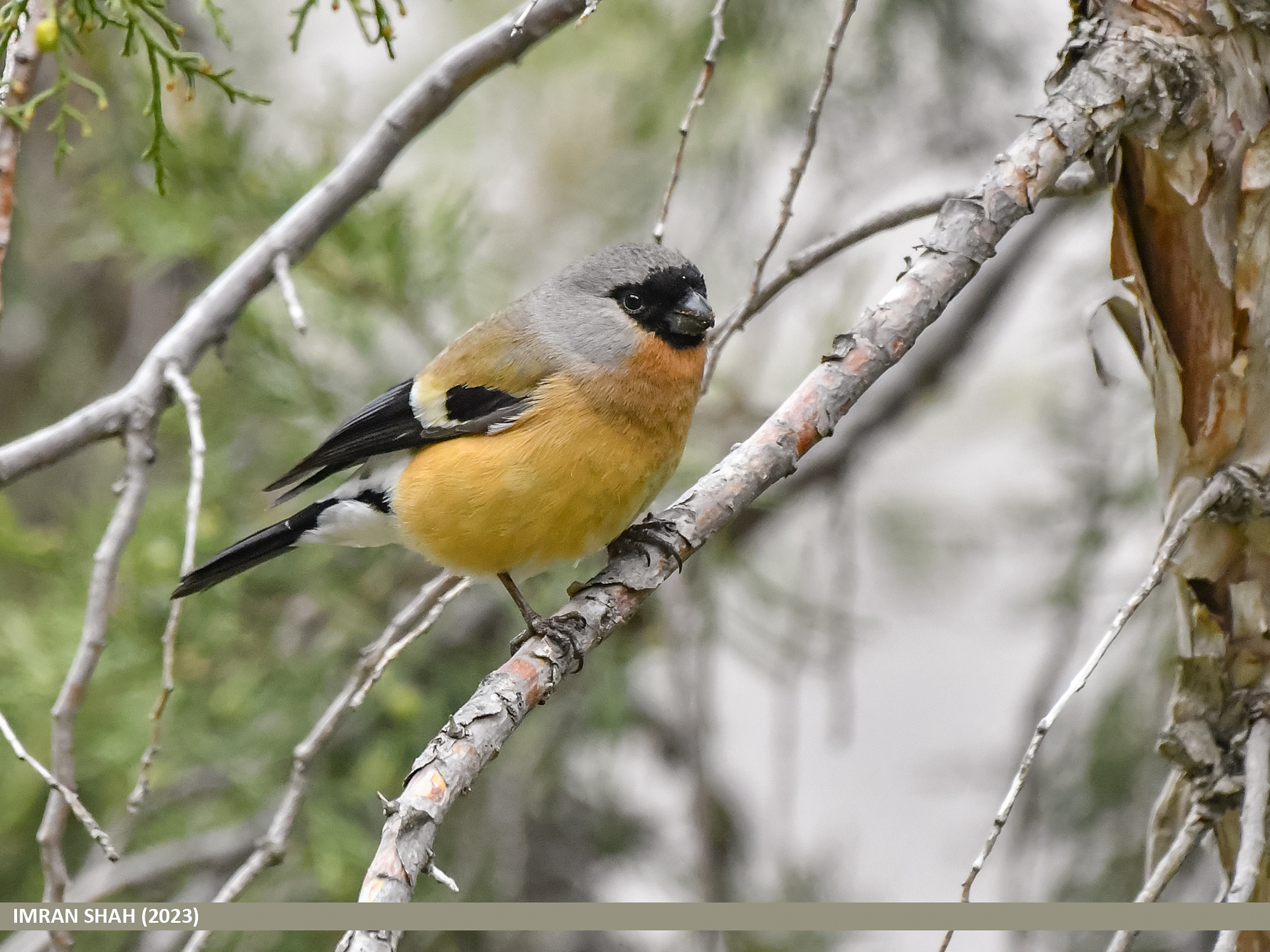
female bird

== Etymology ==
The specific epithet, aurantiaca, comes from the Modern Latin aurantiacus, meaning "orange-coloured". This further derives from Late Latin aurantia, meaning "orange".

== Habitat and distribution ==
Orange bullfinches are found in the forests of the Astore, Neelum, and Diamer districts, and Kaghan valley. During summer and spring seasons they are found in fir, pine, birch and mixed forest at 3,500 m, while they come down to 1,550 m to 2,350 m in winter season. Their extent of occurrence is 201,000 km^{2} (50,000,000 acres). Having a stable population, they are thought to be very common.

== Behaviour ==
They feed primarily on the ground, in snow-covered areas, and at the base of trees and bushes. Flocks often fly into tall trees at regular intervals and then return to the same ground. It feeds primarily on the hard-shelled seeds, buds, fruits, and shoots of trees, as well as large herbaceous shrubs, including the buds and catkins of birch, willow, and cherry.

They are partial migrants.

== Description ==
The dominant colors are grey, yellow, white, brown, beige, and black. Some amount of blue and orange may be present in males. The females have more grey, white, and beige than the males. They weigh 19.3 g (0.68 oz). Measuring from the tip of the beak to the end of the tail, they are 14 cm (5.5 in) long. Their wingspan is 15.58 cm (6.13 in). The length of their legs is 1.52 cm (0.60 in). The length of their beak is 0.73 cm (0.29 in), width and height being 0.67 cm (0.26 in) and 0.8 cm (0.31 in), respectively.
