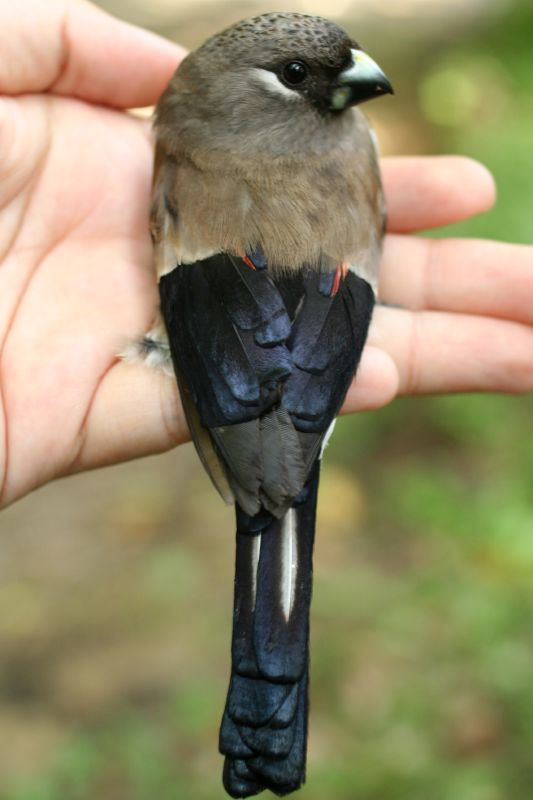

Conservation status
- Least Concern (IUCN 3.1)

Scientific classification
- Kingdom: Animalia
- Phylum: Chordata
- Class: Aves
- Order: Passeriformes
- Family: Fringillidae
- Subfamily: Carduelinae
- Genus: Pyrrhula
- Species: P. nipalensis

Binomial name
- Pyrrhula nipalensis Hodgson, 1836

= Brown bullfinch =

Species of bird

The brown bullfinch (Pyrrhula nipalensis) is a species of bird in the true finch family, Fringillidae. It is found in Bhutan, China, India, Malaysia, Myanmar, Nepal, Pakistan, Taiwan, and Vietnam. Its natural habitats are temperate forests and subtropical or tropical moist montane forests.

The brown bullfinch is a relatively small 16.5 cm (6.5 in) bird with a grayish head, nape, and breast. Its diet consists of nuts and native conifers. In Bhutan or Vietnam, it may be seen in a pair or a group. Little is known about this species.
