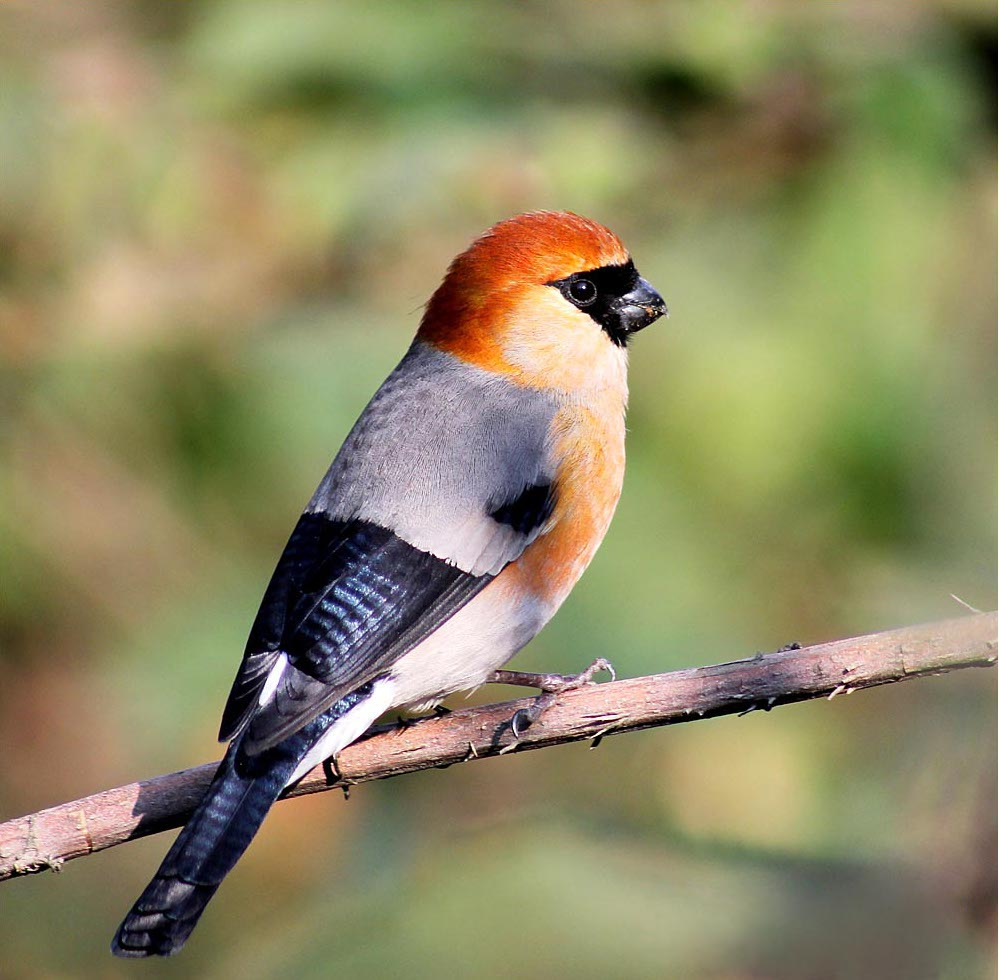
- Male (♂) from Neora Valley National Park
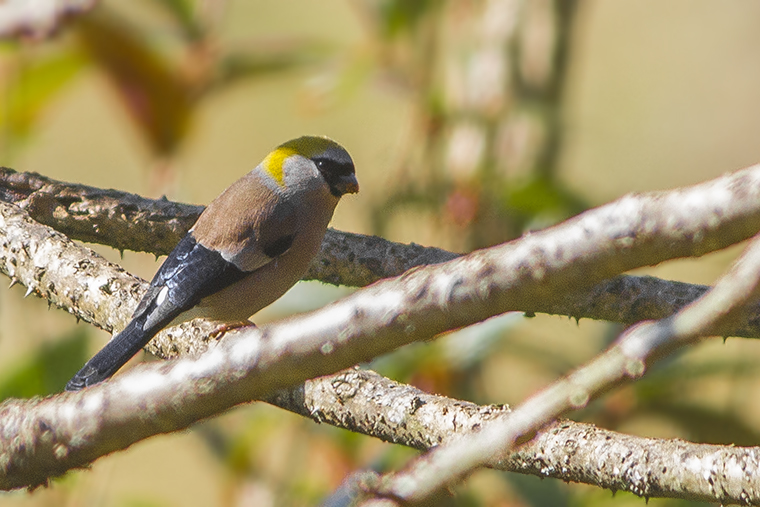
- Female (♀) from Pangolakha Wildlife Sanctuary

Conservation status
- Least Concern (IUCN 3.1)

Scientific classification
- Kingdom: Animalia
- Phylum: Chordata
- Class: Aves
- Order: Passeriformes
- Family: Fringillidae
- Subfamily: Carduelinae
- Genus: Pyrrhula
- Species: P. erythrocephala

Binomial name
- Pyrrhula erythrocephala Vigors, 1832

= Red-headed bullfinch =

Species of bird

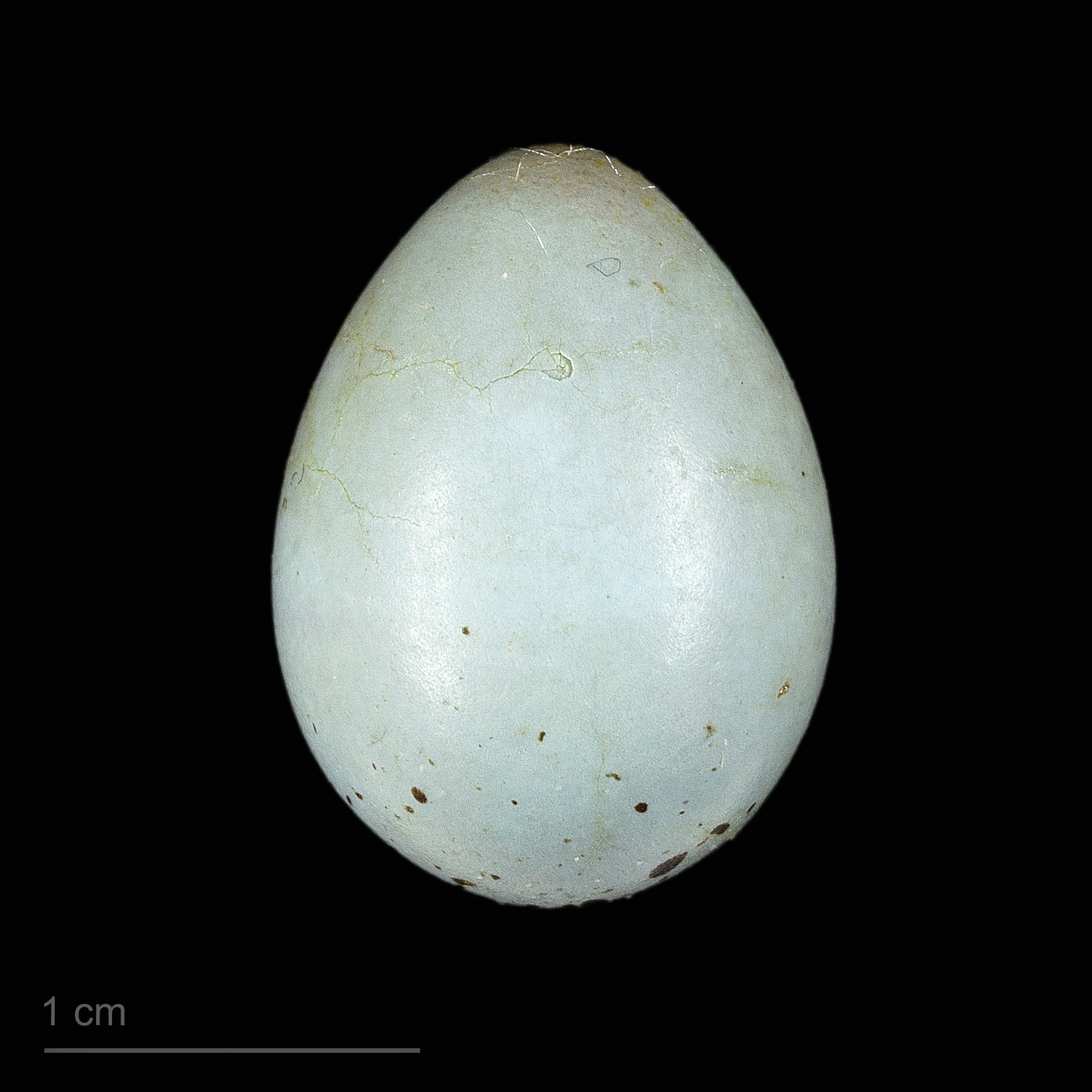
Pyrrhula erythrocephala - MHNT

The red-headed bullfinch (Pyrrhula erythrocephala) is a species of finch in the family Fringillidae, found all across the Himalayas and adjacent highlands. It is found in Bhutan, northern India, Nepal and adjacent southern Tibet. Its natural habitat is temperate forests.

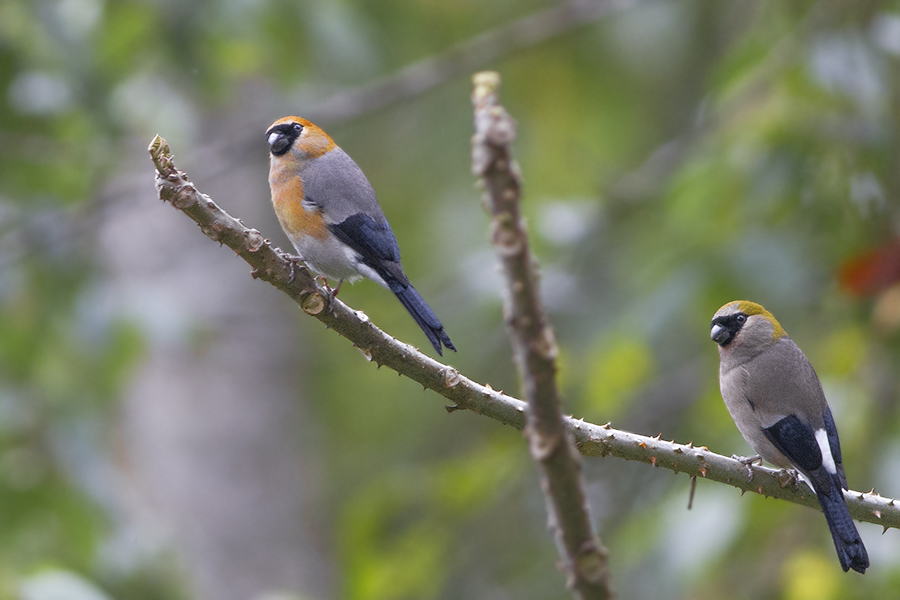
Male and female from Pangolakha Wildlife Sanctuary, East Sikkim, India.
