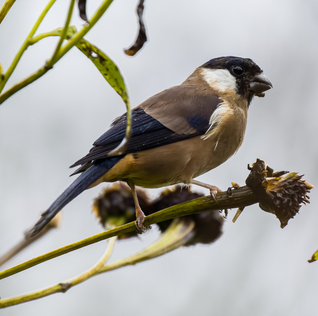
- ssp. steeri seen in Bukindon

Conservation status
- Least Concern (IUCN 3.1)

Scientific classification
- Kingdom: Animalia
- Phylum: Chordata
- Class: Aves
- Order: Passeriformes
- Family: Fringillidae
- Subfamily: Carduelinae
- Genus: Pyrrhula
- Species: P. leucogenis

Binomial name
- Pyrrhula leucogenis Ogilvie-Grant, 1895

= White-cheeked bullfinch =

Species of bird

The white-cheeked bullfinch (Pyrrhula leucogenis) is a species of finch in the family Fringillidae. It is found in mountain regions of the Philippines on the islands of Luzon and Mindanao. It has also been reported on the island of Panay. Its natural habitat is tropical moist montane forests above 1,250 meters above sea level. It is the only bullfinch found in the Philippines.

== Description and taxonomy ==
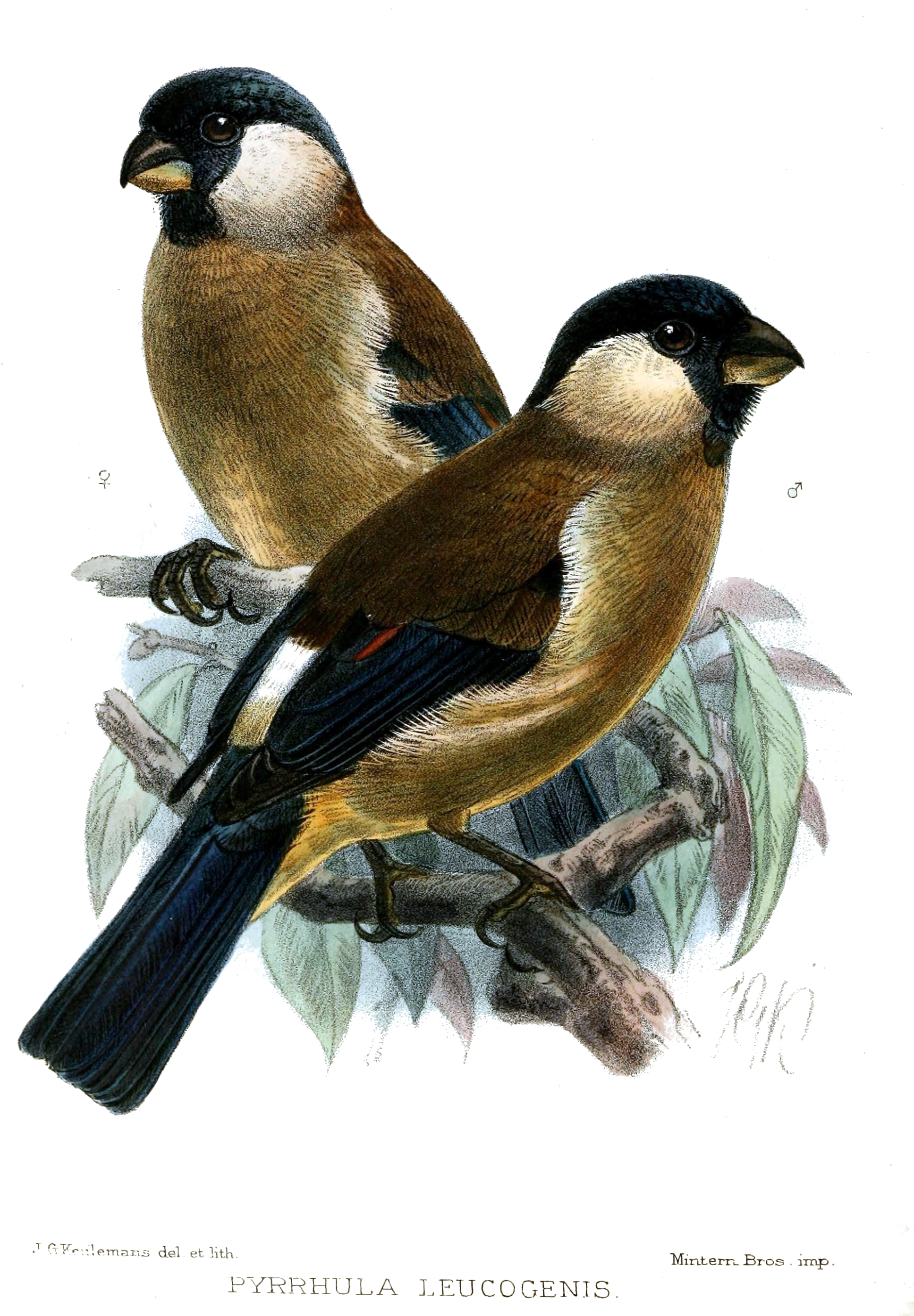

A medium sized bird of the montane forests of Luzon, Panay and Mindanao. It is primarily brown with a black face, crown, wings and tail and a white cheek and wing. Bill is blunt and thick and specialized for seed eating.

Its call is described as repeated downward piping calls.

=== Subspecies ===
Two subspecies are recognized:

- P. l. leucogenis – Found on Luzon
- P. l. steerei – Found on Mindanao; slightly smaller, bill smaller and blackish and has a whiter belly

There is also an undescribed race in Panay.

== Ecology and behavior ==
Diet is not well known but recorded mainly feeding on seeds, small berries, flowers and buds. Some plants and seeds it feeds on include Tithonia, Viburnum and Dendrocnide. Forages in both the canopy and understorey alone, in pairs and small groups. This species forms larger groups in the non breeding season and moves to lower altitudes where they are often seen in groups of up to 40 feeding on the non-native Mexican sunflower.

Birds collected in breeding condition in March to April with enlarged gonads but otherwise nothing is known about this birds breeding ecology. This species nest is undescribed

== Habitat and conservation status ==
It occupies montane mossy forest above 1,250 meters above sea level. It is known to descend to lower altitudes in the breeding season and form large feeding flocks of up to 40 birds.

IUCN has assessed this bird as Least-concern as a lot of its montane habitat is difficult to access and it also has a wide range. However, it is still affected by habitat loss through deforestation, mining, land conversion and slash-and-burn - just not to the same extent as lowland forest.

== Bibliography ==
- Kennedy, Robert S; et al. (2013). A Guide to the Birds of the Philippines. Oxford University Press.
