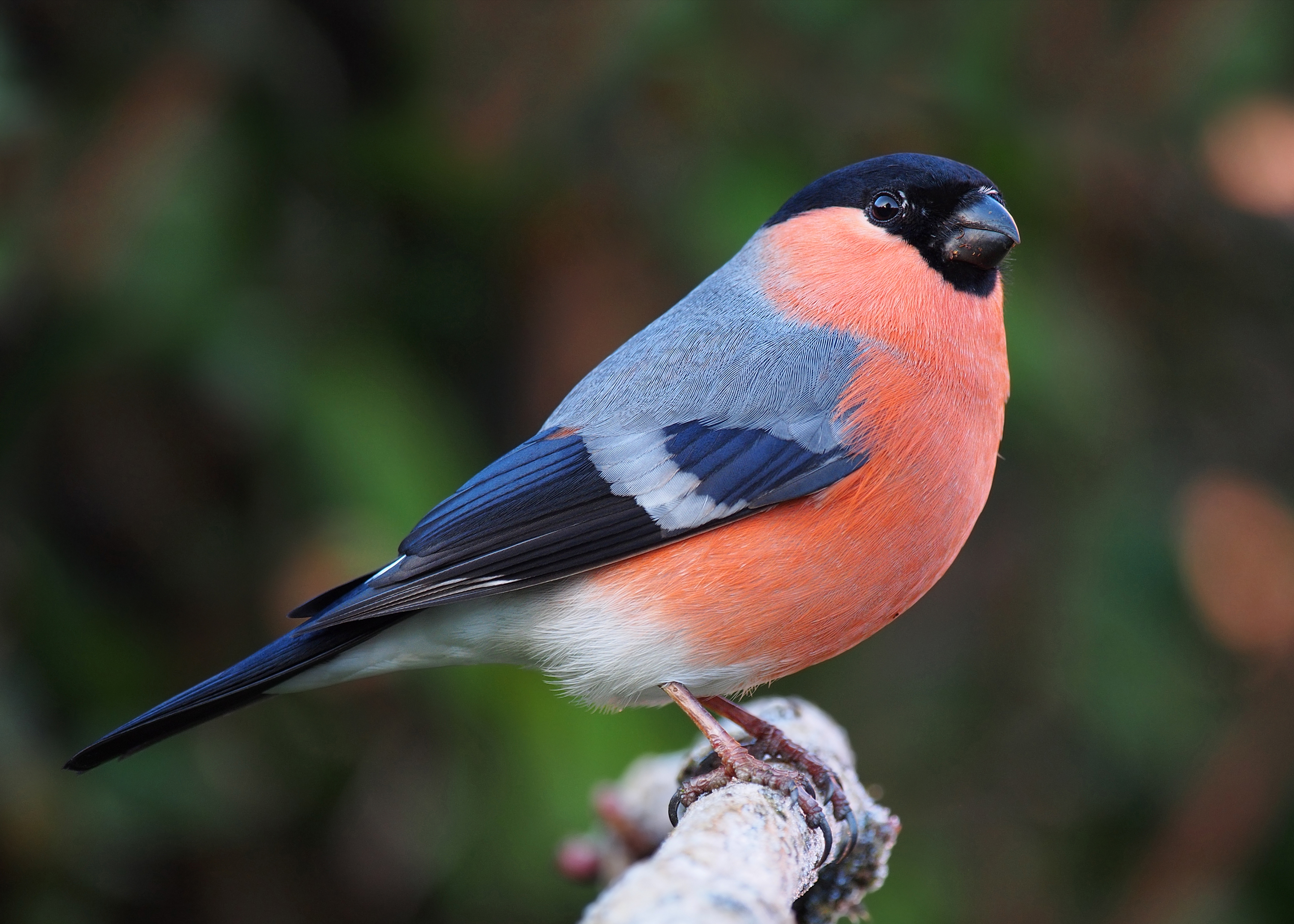
- Eurasian bullfinch, Pyrrhula pyrrhula

Scientific classification
- Kingdom: Animalia
- Phylum: Chordata
- Class: Aves
- Order: Passeriformes
- Family: Fringillidae
- Subfamily: Carduelinae
- Genus: Pyrrhula; Brisson, 1760

Type species
- Loxia pyrrhula = Pyrrhula pyrrhula Linnaeus, 1758

Species
- See text.

= Pyrrhula =

Bullfinches

Genus of birds

Pyrrhula is a small genus of passerine birds, commonly called bullfinches, belonging to the finch family (Fringillidae). The genus has a Palearctic distribution; almost all species occur in Asia, with two species exclusively in the Himalayas and one species, P. pyrrhula, also occurring in Europe. The Azores bullfinch (P. murina) is a critically endangered species (about 120 pairs remaining), occurring only in the east of the island of São Miguel in the Azores archipelago.

The evolution of the bullfinch species started soon after the pine grosbeak's ancestors diverged from them (at the end of the Middle Miocene, about 12 mya), and it is quite possible that the latter species evolved in North America; what is fairly certain is that the bullfinch radiation started in the general area of the Himalayas. The mountain finches also seem to be part of this clade.

Bullfinches have glossy black wings and tail feathers. They show a white rump. The legs and feet are fleshy brown. Their short, swollen bill is adapted to eat buds, and is black except for the brown bullfinch, which has a grey or greenish-grey bill. The males can be distinguished by their orange or red breast. Some species have a black cap.

== Taxonomy ==
The genus Pyrrhula was introduced in 1760 by the French zoologist Mathurin Jacques Brisson. The name was derived by tautonymy from the binomial name of the Eurasian bullfinch Loxia pyrrhula introduced by Linnaeus in 1758.

The bullfinches in the genus Pyrrhula are sister to the pine grosbeak, the only species placed in the genus Pinicola.

=== Species ===
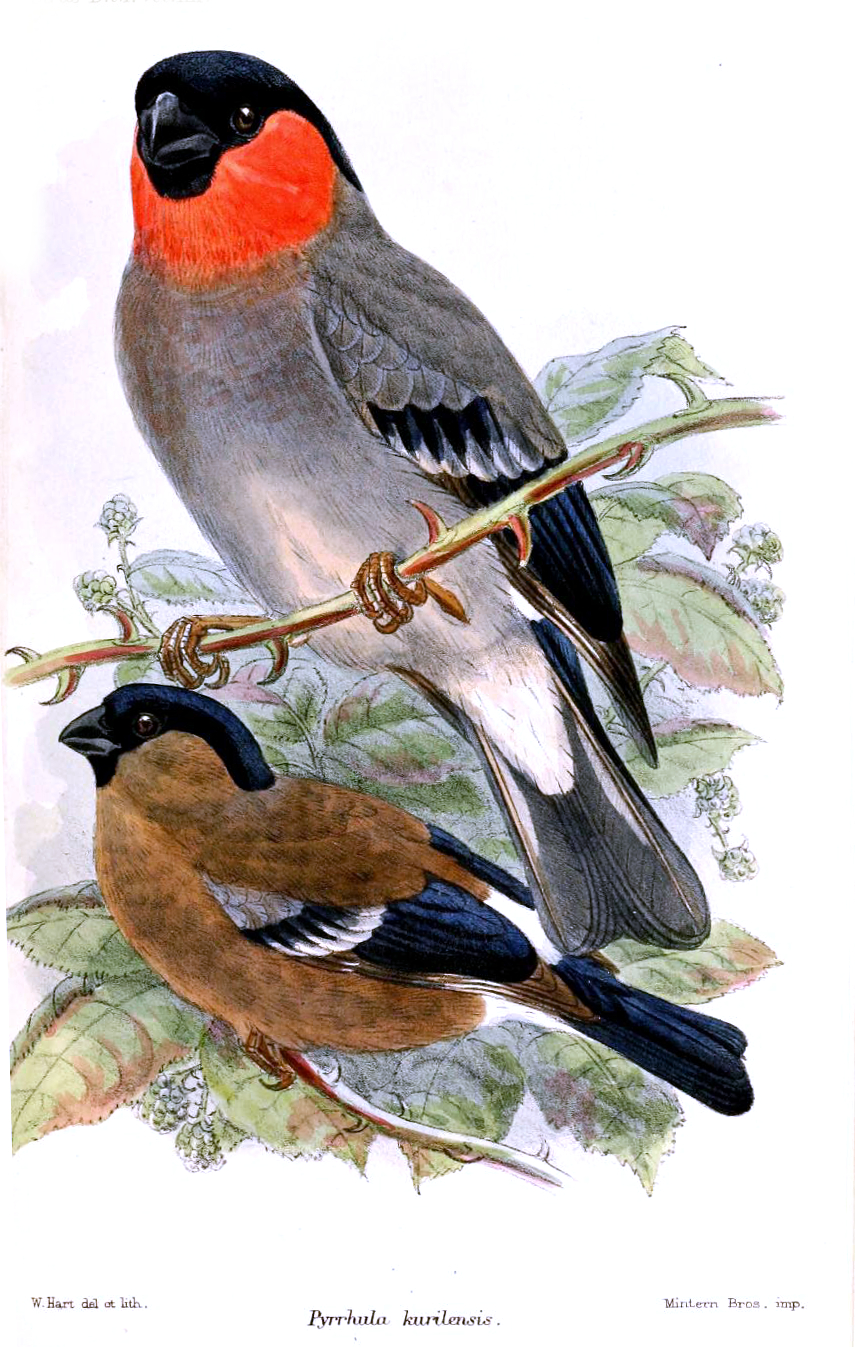
P. p. griseiventris from the Kurile Islands, illustrated by William Matthew Hart, 1888

There are eight extant and one extinct recognized species in the genus:

Image	Scientific name	Common name	Distribution
	Pyrrhula aurantiaca	Orange bullfinch	India and Pakistan
	Pyrrhula erythaca	Grey-headed bullfinch	Bhutan, China, India, Myanmar, and Nepal
	Pyrrhula owstoni	Taiwan bullfinch (split from P. erythaca)	Taiwan
	Pyrrhula erythrocephala	Red-headed bullfinch	Bhutan, northern India, Nepal
	Pyrrhula leucogenis	White-cheeked bullfinch	the Philippines
	Pyrrhula murina	Azores bullfinch	São Miguel Island, in the Azores archipelago of Macaronesia in the North Atlantic Ocean.
	Pyrrhula nipalensis	Brown bullfinch	Bhutan, China, India, Malaysia, Myanmar, Nepal, Pakistan, Taiwan, and Vietnam.
	Pyrrhula pyrrhula	Eurasian bullfinch	across Europe and temperate Asia.
	†Pyrrhula crassa	†Greater Azores bullfinch	Extinct, likely by the 15th century.
