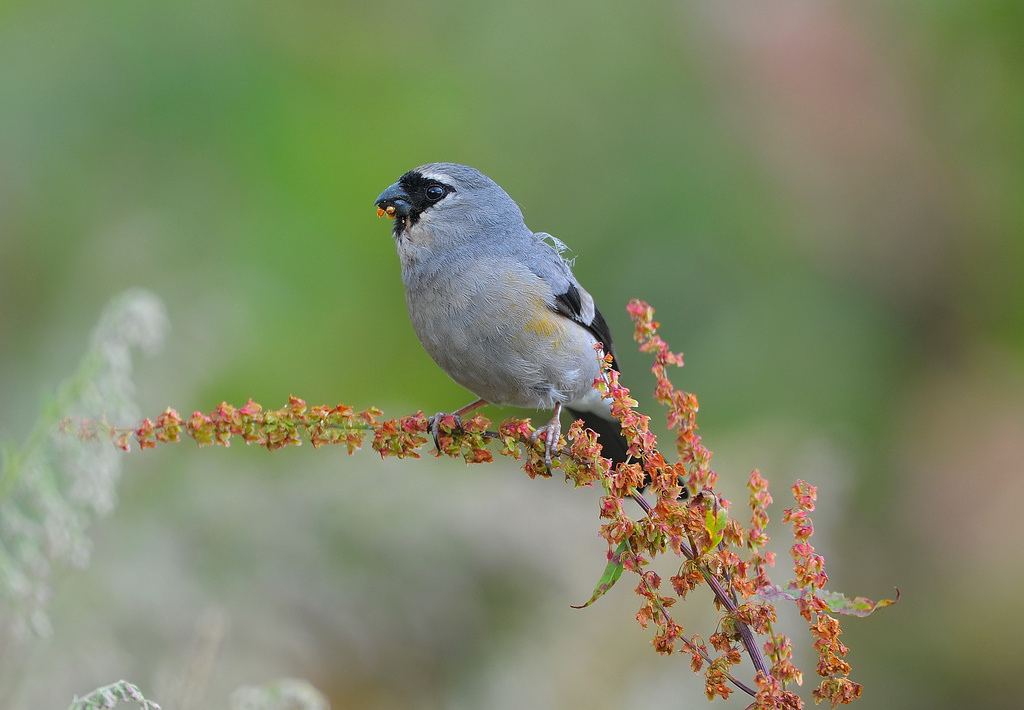

Conservation status
- Least Concern (IUCN 3.1)

Scientific classification
- Kingdom: Animalia
- Phylum: Chordata
- Class: Aves
- Order: Passeriformes
- Family: Fringillidae
- Subfamily: Carduelinae
- Genus: Pyrrhula
- Species: P. erythaca

Binomial name
- Pyrrhula erythaca Blyth, 1862

= Grey-headed bullfinch =

Species of bird

The Grey-headed bullfinch (Pyrrhula erythaca), Gray-headed bullfinch, or Beavan's Bullfinch is a species of finch in the family Fringillidae.

It is widespread across China; also present in Bhutan, northeast India and Taiwan; wintering range extends to eastern Burma.

Its natural habitats are boreal forest and temperate forest.

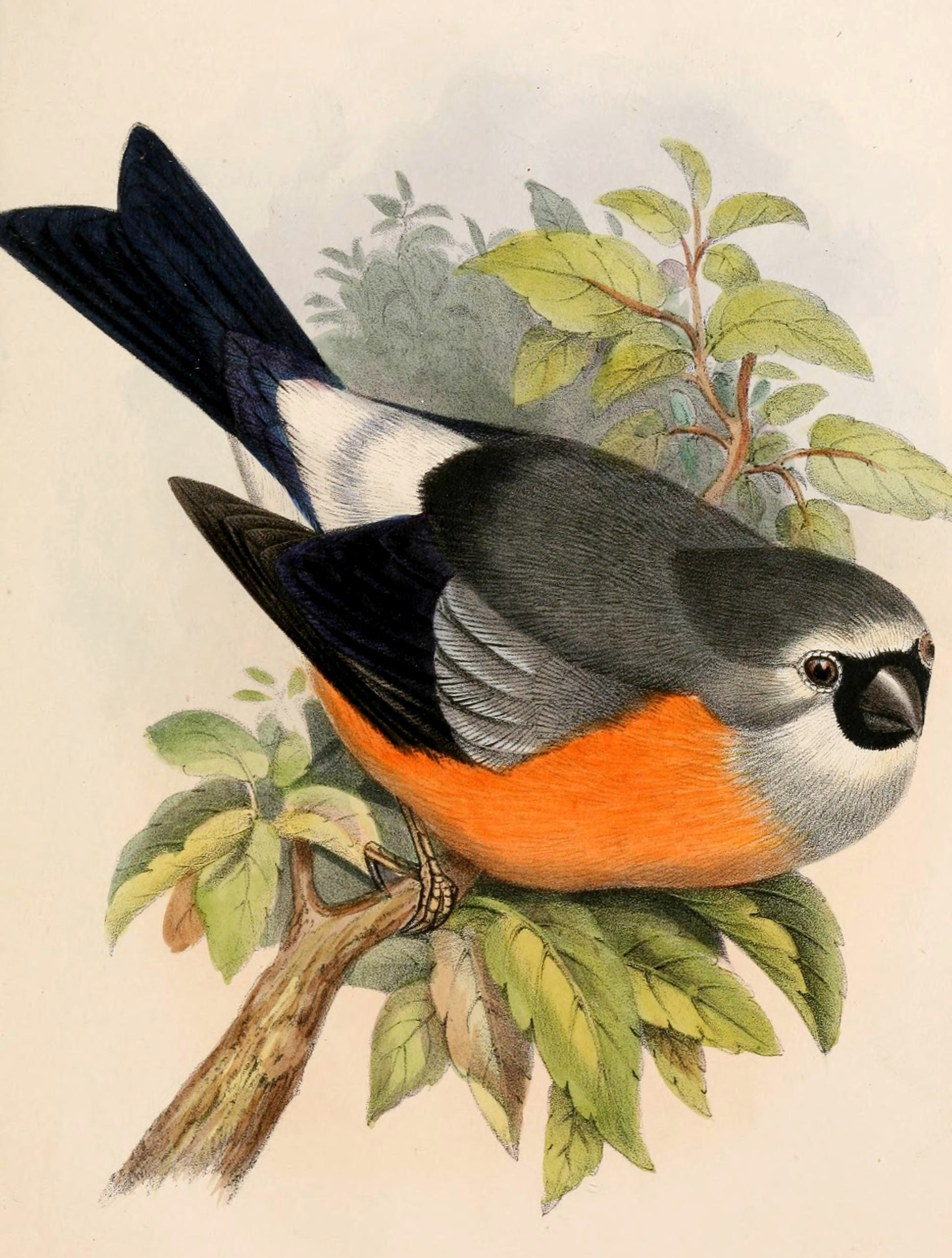
An 1863 illustration by John Jennens

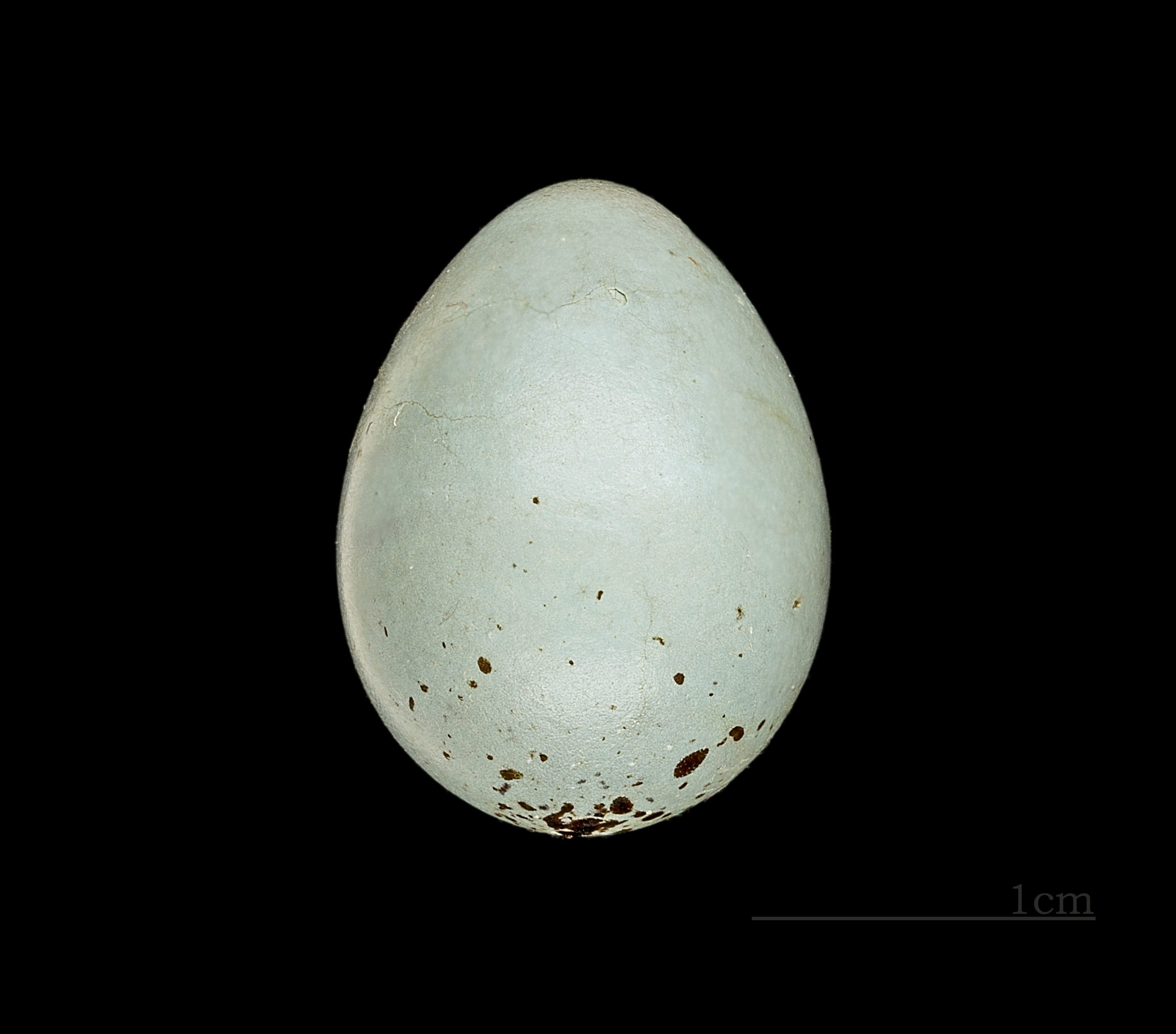
Egg of Pyrrhula erythaca MHNT
