= Boa Esperança =

Boa Esperança (literally meaning "good hope" in Portuguese) may refer to the following places:

== In Brazil ==
- Boa Esperança, Paraná, a municipality in Paraná state
- Boa Esperança, northeast of Pará, a municipality northeastern of Pará state
- Boa Esperança, southwest of Pará, a town southwest of Pará state
- Boa Esperança, Espírito Santo, a municipality in Espírito Santo state
- Boa Esperança, Minas Gerais, a municipality in Minas Gerais state

== Others ==
Boa Esperança (ship), a seaworthy replica of a caravel, on display as a museum in the port of Lagos

== See also ==
- Cape of Good Hope, Portuguese name Cabo da Boa Esperança
