= Marcio Pacheco =

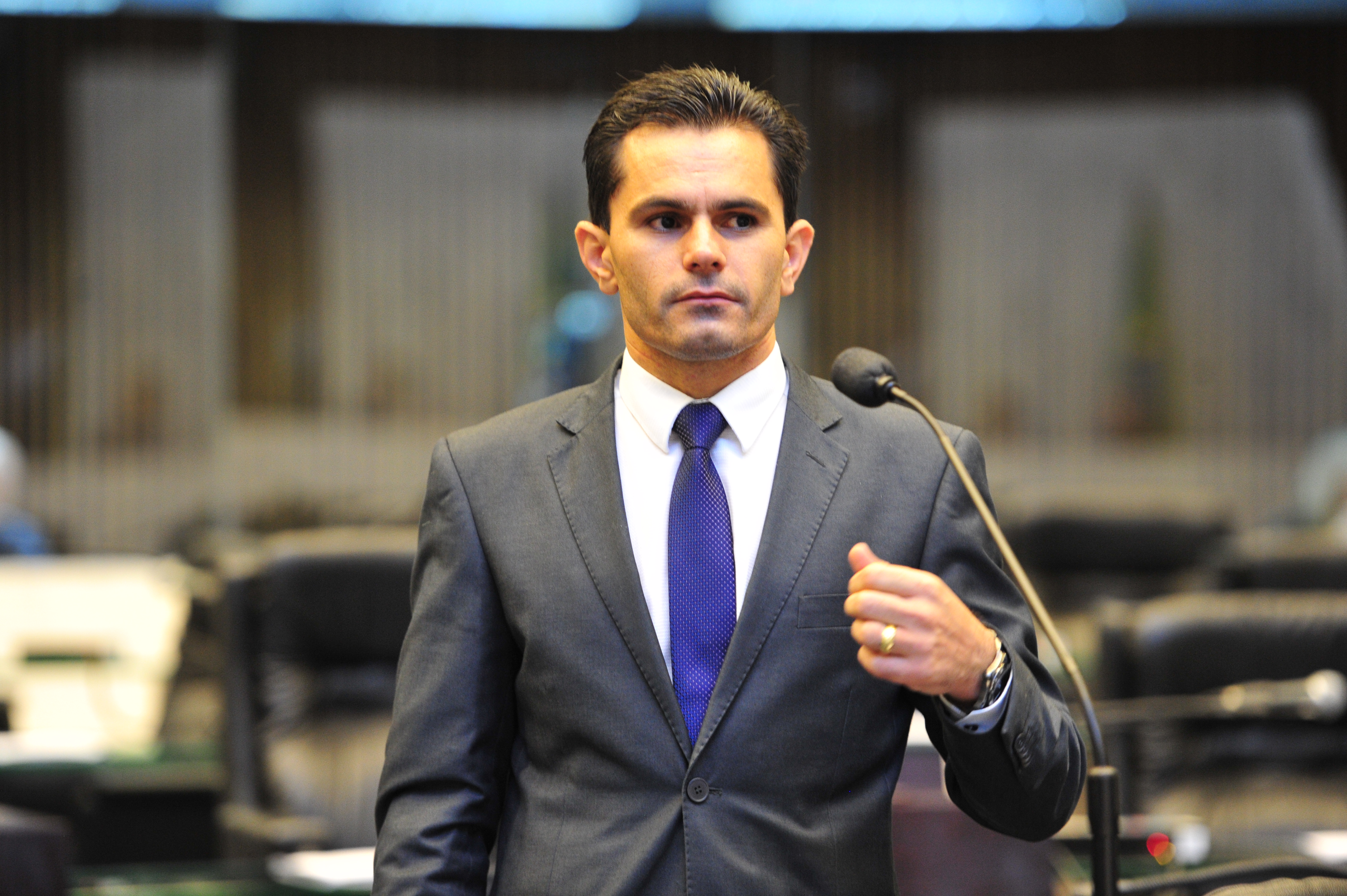
Marcio Pacheco

Márcio José Pacheco Ramos (born April 6, 1977, in Boa Esperança, Paraná) is a Brazilian federal police officer and a politician, currently serving his third term as a state deputy for Paraná representing the Progressistas party.

== Political career ==
Márcio Pacheco began his political career as a city councilor in Cascavel, elected in 2012 by the former PPL party. The following year, he assumed the presidency of the Cascavel City Council for the 2013/2014 term.

In 2014, he was elected state deputy for Paraná with 24,855 votes.

In 2018, he was re-elected state deputy with 39,323 votes. In 2022, he was re-elected for his third consecutive term as a state deputy, representing the Republicanos party, with 36,423 votes.

He also ran for mayor of Cascavel in 2016, 2020 and 2024 without succeeding.
