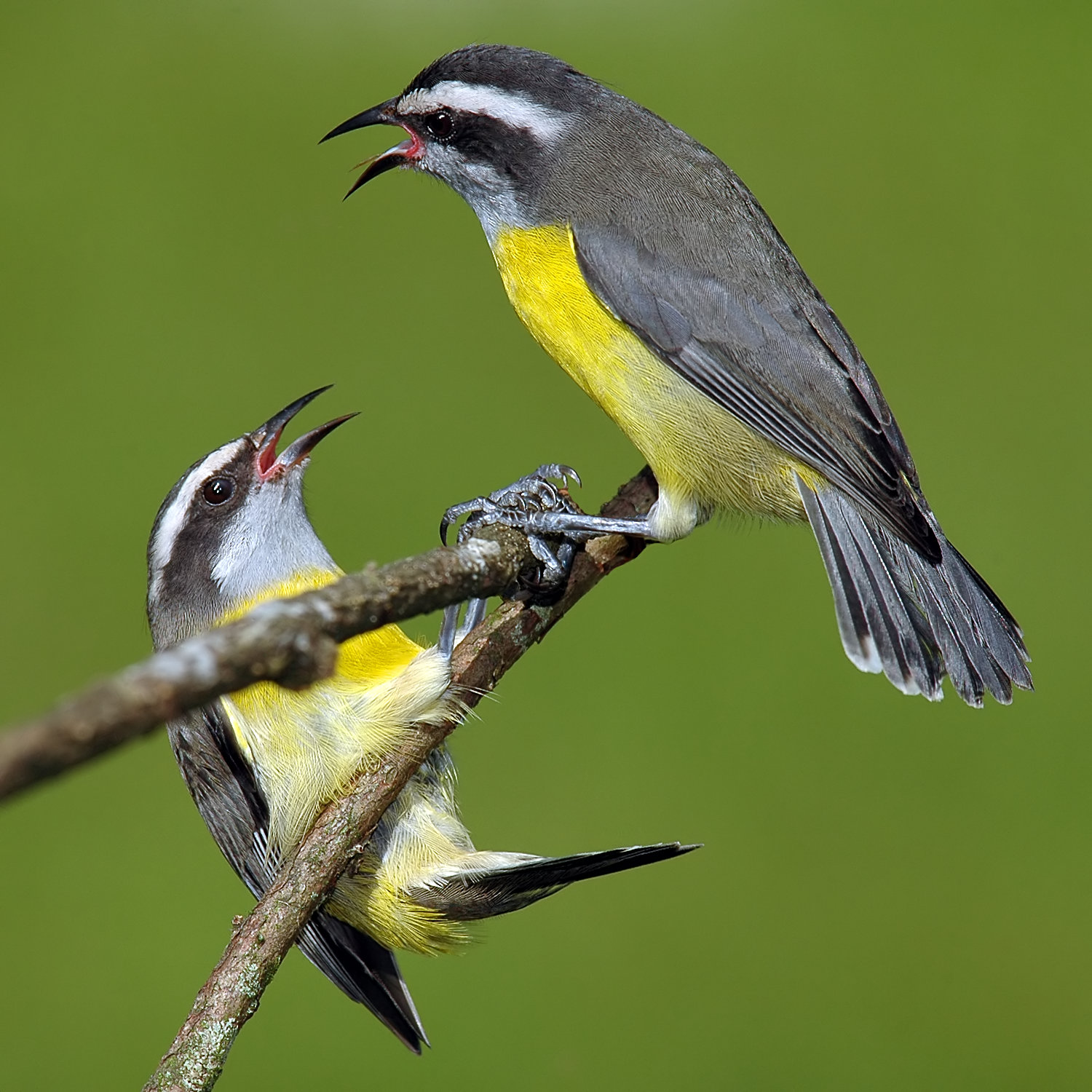
- In Campo Limpo Paulista, São Paulo, Brazil
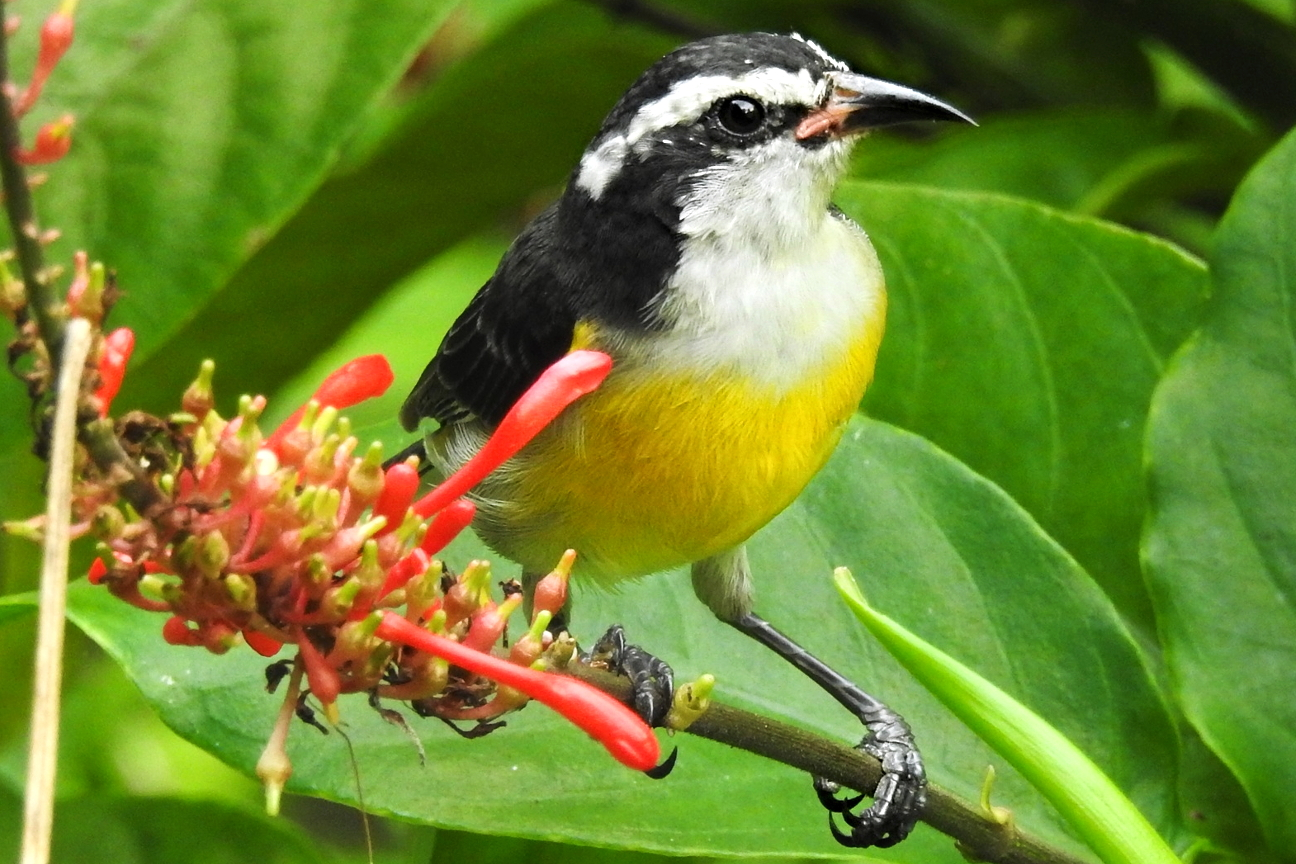
- Bahamas subspecies, Florida

Conservation status
- Least Concern (IUCN 3.1)

Scientific classification
- Kingdom: Animalia
- Phylum: Chordata
- Class: Aves
- Order: Passeriformes
- Family: Thraupidae
- Genus: Coereba; Vieillot, 1809
- Species: C. flaveola

Binomial name
- Coereba flaveola (Linnaeus, 1758)

Synonyms
- Certhia flaveola Linnaeus, 1758; Certhiola martinicensis; Certhiola dominicana Taylor, 1864

= Bananaquit =

Species of bird

The bananaquit (Coereba flaveola) is a species of passerine bird in the tanager family Thraupidae. Before the development of molecular genetics in the 21st century, its relationship to other species was uncertain, and it was placed with the buntings and New World sparrows in the family Emberizidae, with New World warblers in the family Parulidae, or its own monotypic family, Coerebidae. This small, active nectarivore is found in warmer parts of the Americas and is generally common.

Its name derives from its yellow color and the English word quit, which refers to small passerines of tropical America; cf. grassquit, orangequit.

== Taxonomy ==
Carl Linnaeus formally described the bananaquit in his landmark 1758 10th edition of Systema Naturae as Certhia flaveola. He based his description on the "black and yellow bird" described by John Ray and Hans Sloane, and the "Black and Yellow Creeper" described and illustrated by George Edwards in 1751. The bananaquit was reclassified as the only member of the genus Coereba by Louis Pierre Vieillot in 1809. The genus name is of uncertain origin but may be from a Tupi name Güirá for a small black and yellow bird. The specific epithet flaveolus is a diminutive of the Latin flavus meaning "golden" or "yellow".

Before the development of techniques to sequence DNA, the relationship of the bananaquit to other species was uncertain. It was variously placed with the New World warblers in the family Parulidae, with the buntings and New World sparrows in the family Emberizidae, or in its own monotypic family, Coerebidae. Based on the results of molecular phylogenetic studies, the bananaquit is now placed in the tanager family Thraupidae and belongs with Darwin's finches to the subfamily Coerebinae.

It is still unclear whether any of the island subspecies should be elevated to species, but phylogenetic studies have revealed three clades: the nominate group from Jamaica, Hispaniola, and the Cayman Islands, the bahamensis group from the Bahamas and Quintana Roo, and the bartholemica group from South and Central America, Mexico (except Quintana Roo), the Lesser Antilles and Puerto Rico. Several taxa were not sampled, but most of these are easily placed in the above groups based on zoogeography alone. Exceptions are oblita (San Andrés Island) and tricolor (Providencia Island), and their placement is therefore uncertain. In February 2010, the International Ornithological Congress listed bahamensis and bartholemica as proposed splits from C. flaveola.

=== Subspecies ===
There are 41 currently recognized subspecies:

- C. f. bahamensis (Reichenbach, 1853): Bahamas
- C. f. caboti (Baird, 1873): east Yucatan Peninsula and nearby islands
- C. f. flaveola (Linnaeus, 1758): nominate, Jamaica
- C. f. sharpei (Cory, 1886): Cayman Is.
- C. f. bananivora (Gmelin, 1789): Hispaniola and nearby islands
- C. f. nectarea Wetmore, 1929: Tortue I.
- C. f. portoricensis (Bryant, 1866): Puerto Rico
- C. f. sanctithomae (Sundevall, 1869): north Virgin Is.
- C. f. newtoni (Baird, 1873): Saint Croix (south Virgin Is.)
- C. f. bartholemica (Sparrman, 1788): north and central Lesser Antilles
- C. f. martinicana (Reichenbach, 1853): Martinique and Saint Lucia (south central Lesser Antilles)
- C. f. barbadensis (Baird, 1873): Barbados
- C. f. atrata (Lawrence, 1878): St. Vincent (south Lesser Antilles)
- C. f. aterrima (Lesson, 1830): Grenada and the Grenadines (south Lesser Antilles)
- C. f. uropygialis von Berlepsch, 1892: Aruba and Curaçao (Netherlands Antilles)
- C. f. tricolor (Ridgway, 1884): Providencia I. (off east Nicaragua)
- C. f. oblita Griscom, 1923: San Andrés I. (off east Nicaragua)
- C. f. mexicana (Sclater, 1857): southeastern Mexico to western Panama
- C. f. cerinoclunis Bangs, 1901: Pearl Is. (south of Panama)
- C. f. columbiana (Cabanis, 1866): eastern Panama to southwestern Colombia and southern Venezuela
- C. f. bonairensis Voous, 1955: Bonaire I. (Netherlands Antilles)
- C. f. melanornis Phelps & Phelps, 1954: Cayo Sal I. (off Venezuela)
- C. f. lowii Cory, 1909: Los Roques Is. (off Venezuela)
- C. f. ferryi Cory, 1909: La Tortuga I. (off Venezuela)
- C. f. frailensis Phelps & Phelps, 1946: Los Frailes and Los Hermanos Is. (off Venezuela)
- C. f. laurae Lowe, 1908: Los Testigos (off Venezuela)
- C. f. luteola (Cabanis, 1850): coastal northern Colombia and Venezuela, Trinidad and Tobago
- C. f. obscura Cory, 1913: northeastern Colombia and western Venezuela
- C. f. minima (Bonaparte, 1854): eastern Colombia and southern Venezuela to French Guiana and north central Brazil
- C. f. montana Lowe, 1912: Andes of northwestern Venezuela
- C. f. caucae Chapman, 1914: western Colombia
- C. f. gorgonae Thayer & Bangs, 1905: Gorgona I. (off western Colombia)
- C. f. intermedia (Salvadori & Festa, 1899): southwestern Colombia, western Ecuador and northern Peru east to southern Venezuela and western Brazil
- C. f. bolivari Zimmer & Phelps, 1946: eastern Venezuela
- C. f. guianensis (Cabanis, 1850): southeastern Venezuela to Guyana
- C. f. roraimae Chapman, 1929: tepui regions of southeastern Venezuela, southwestern Guyana and northern Brazil
- C. f. pacifica Lowe, 1912: eastern Peru
- C. f. magnirostris (Taczanowski, 1880): northern Peru
- C. f. dispar Zimmer, 1942: north central Peru to western Bolivia
- C. f. chloropyga (Cabanis, 1850): east central Peru to central Bolivia and east to eastern Brazil, northern Uruguay, northeastern Argentina and Paraguay
- C. f. alleni Lowe, 1912: eastern Bolivia to central Brazil

=== Subspecies gallery ===
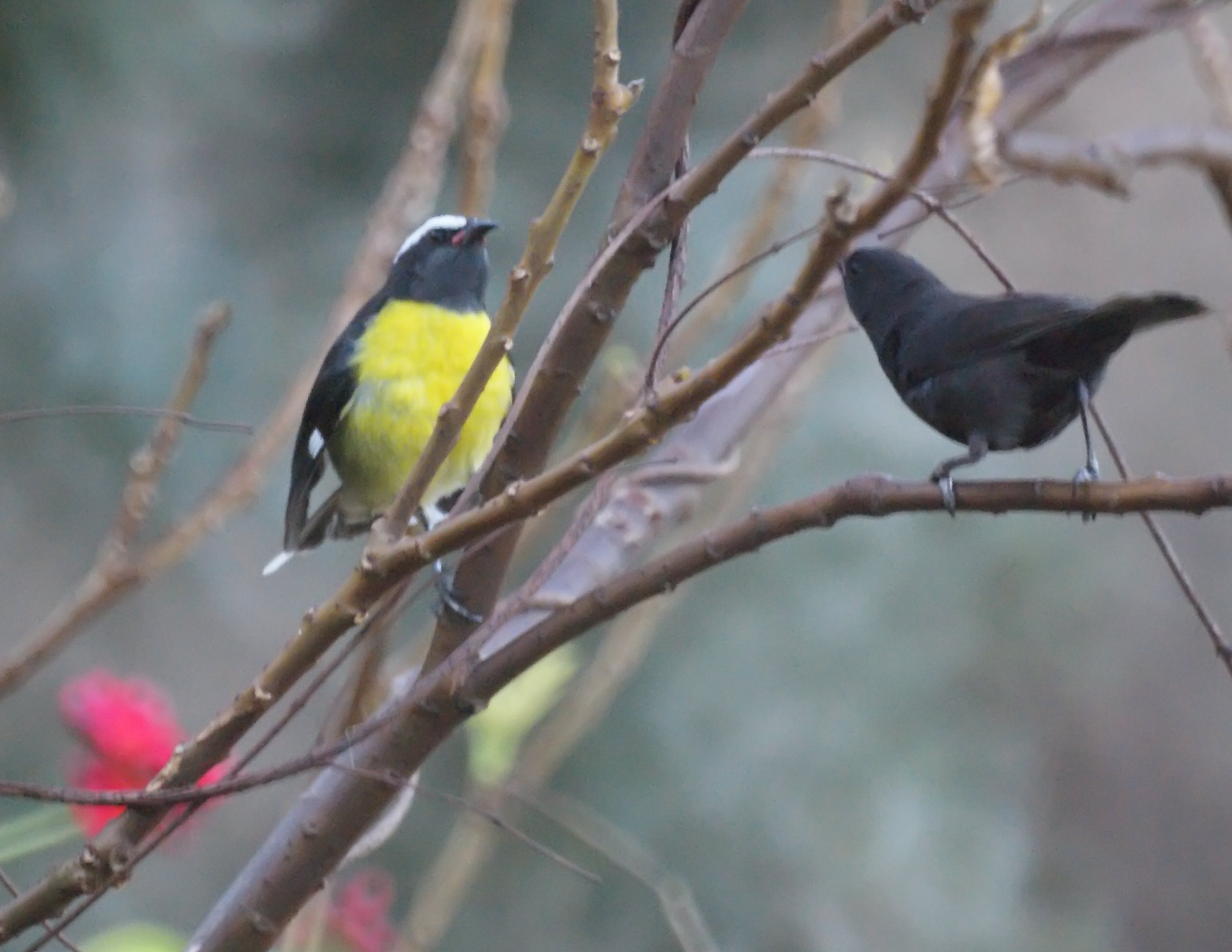
C. f. aterrima ("normal" and dark morph), Grenada

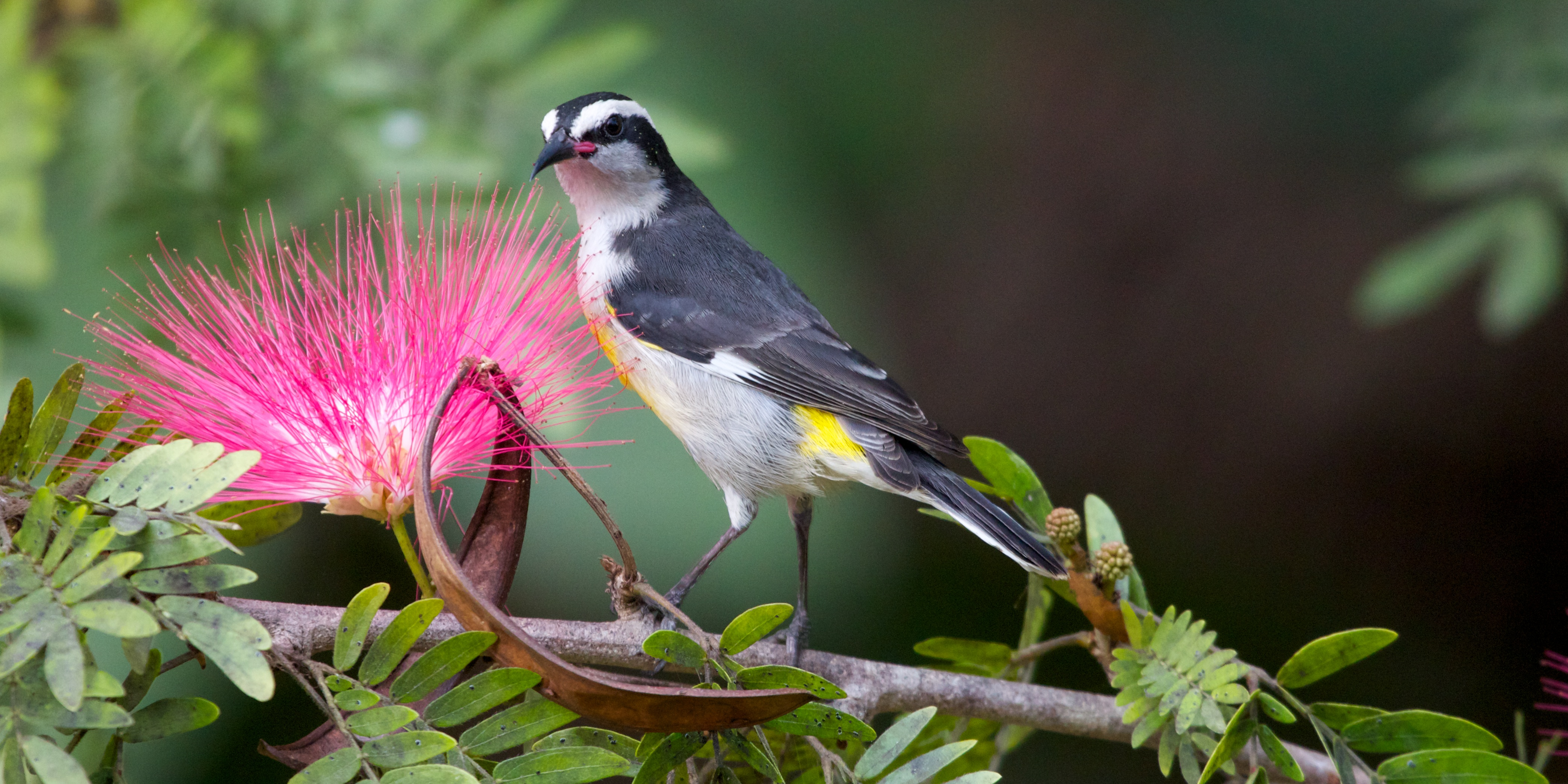
C. f. bahamensis, Bahamas

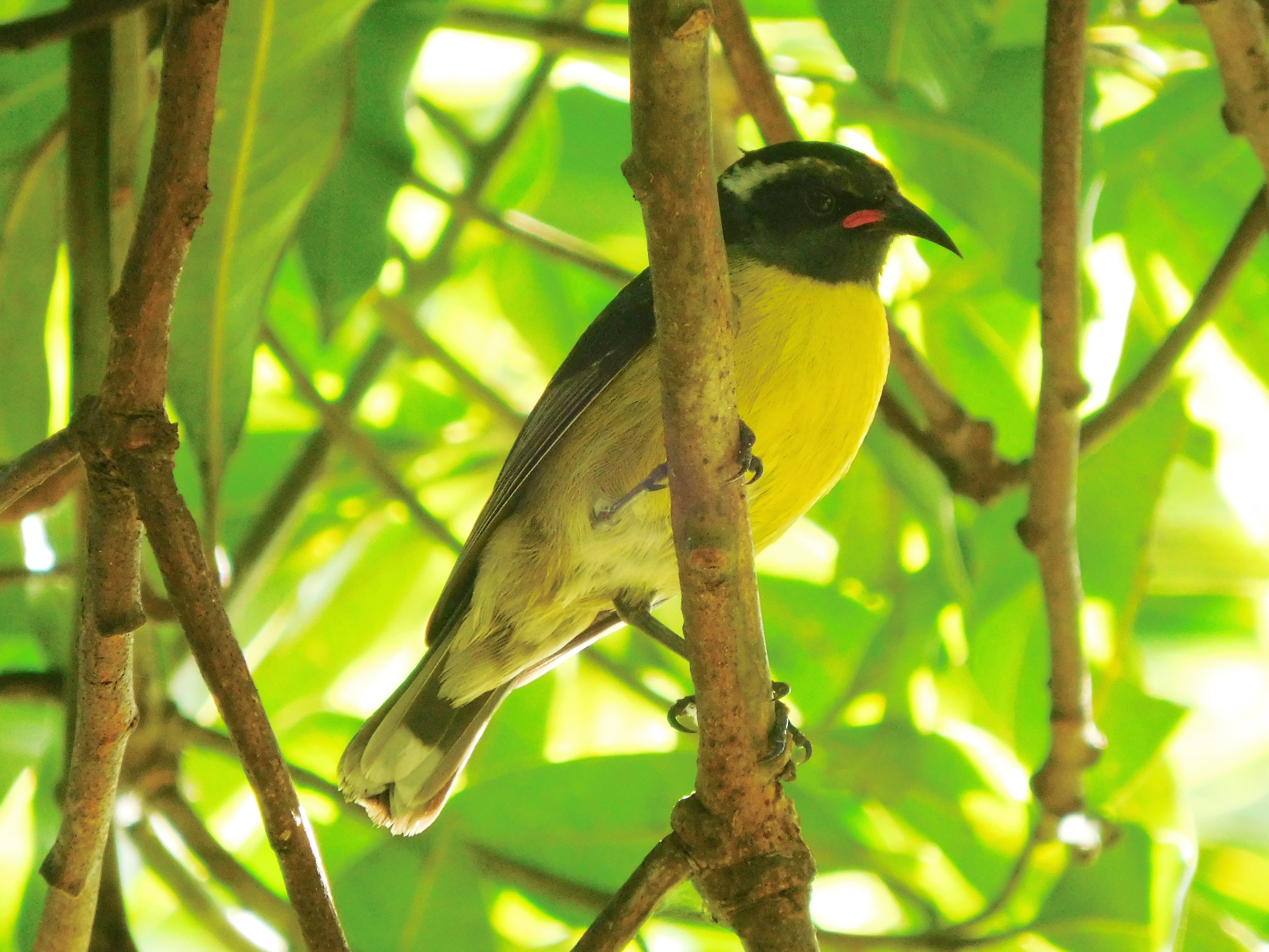
C. f. bartholemica, Guadeloupe

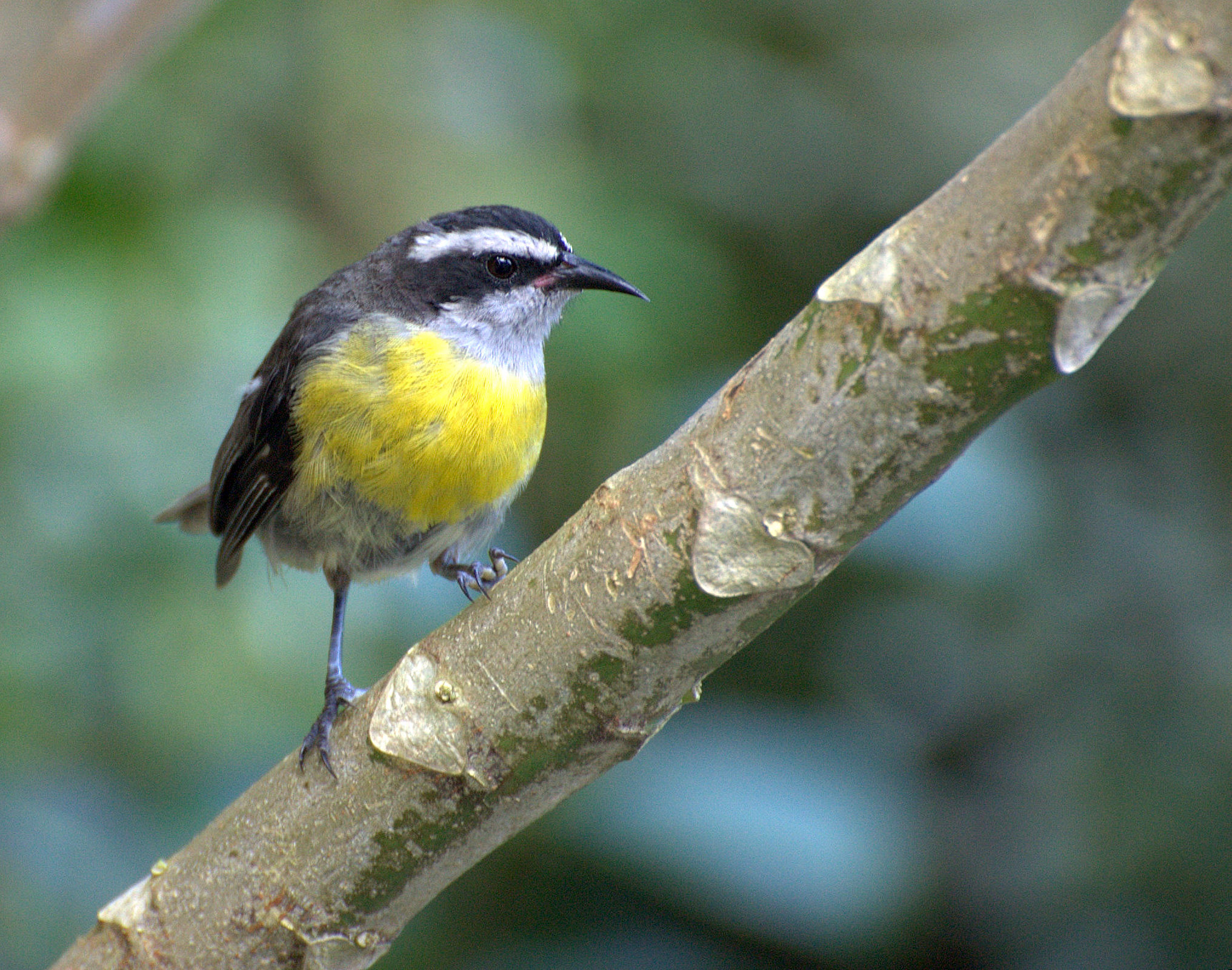
C. f. chloropyga, São Paulo, Brazil

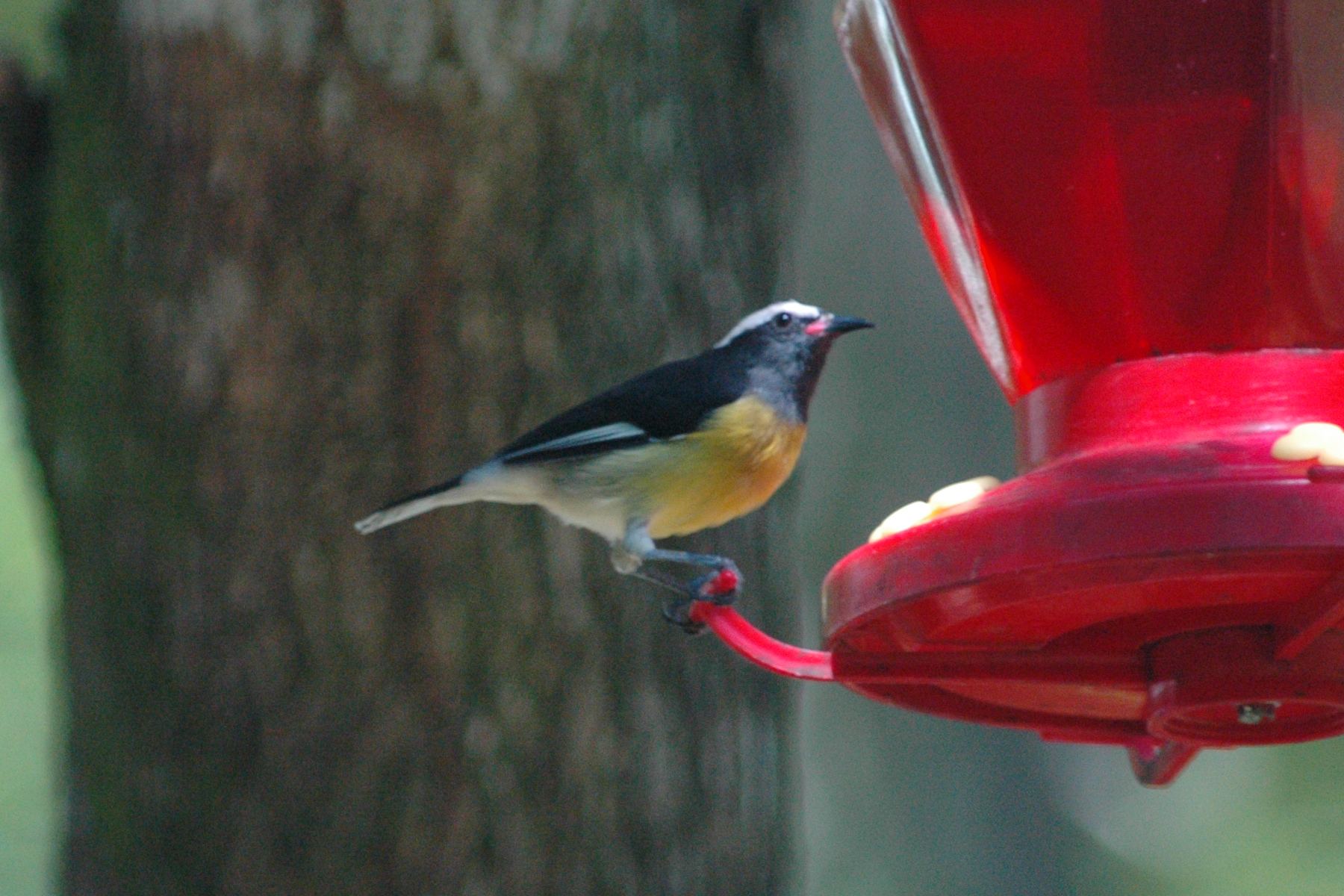
C. f. flaveola, Jamaica

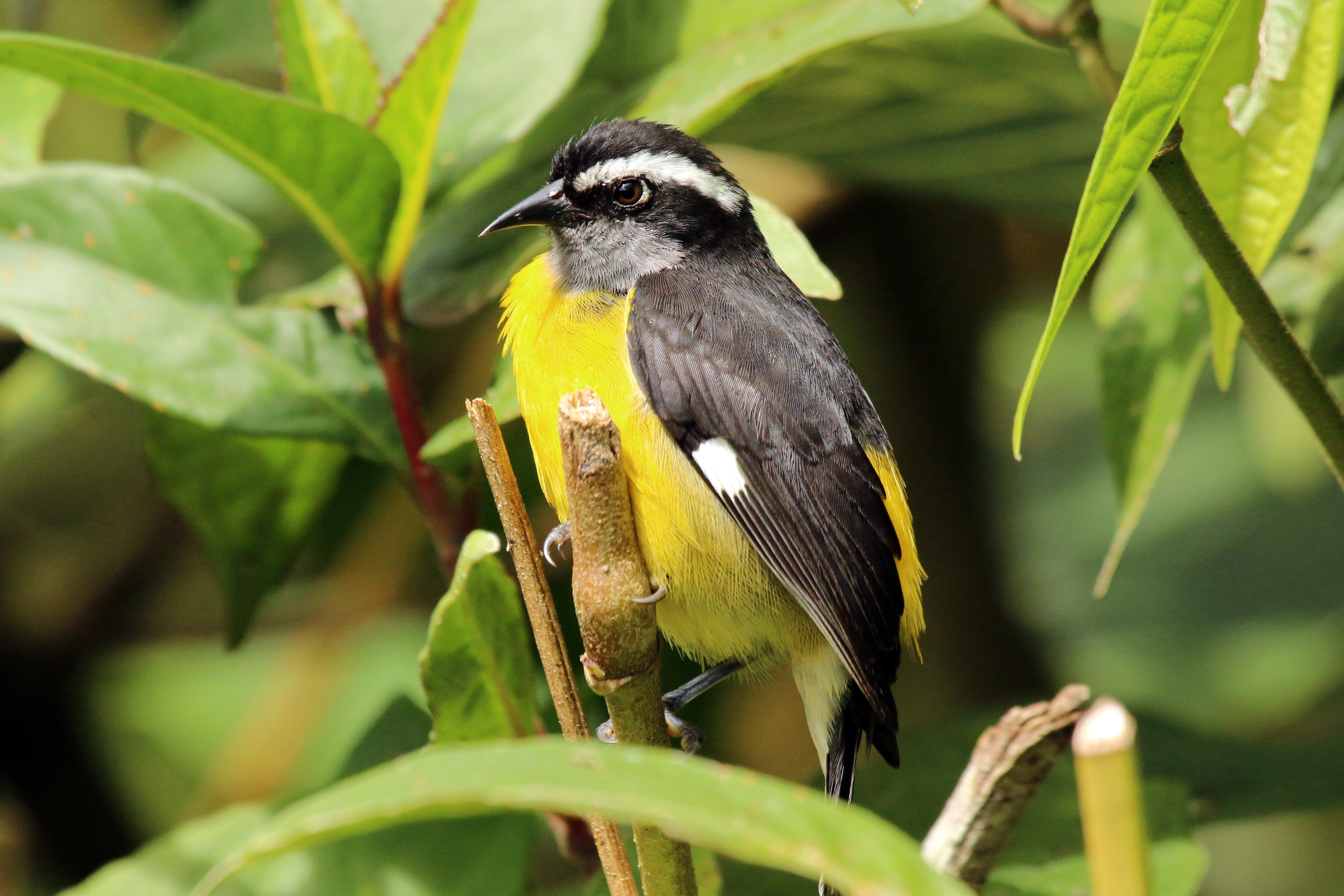
C. f. luteola, Trinidad

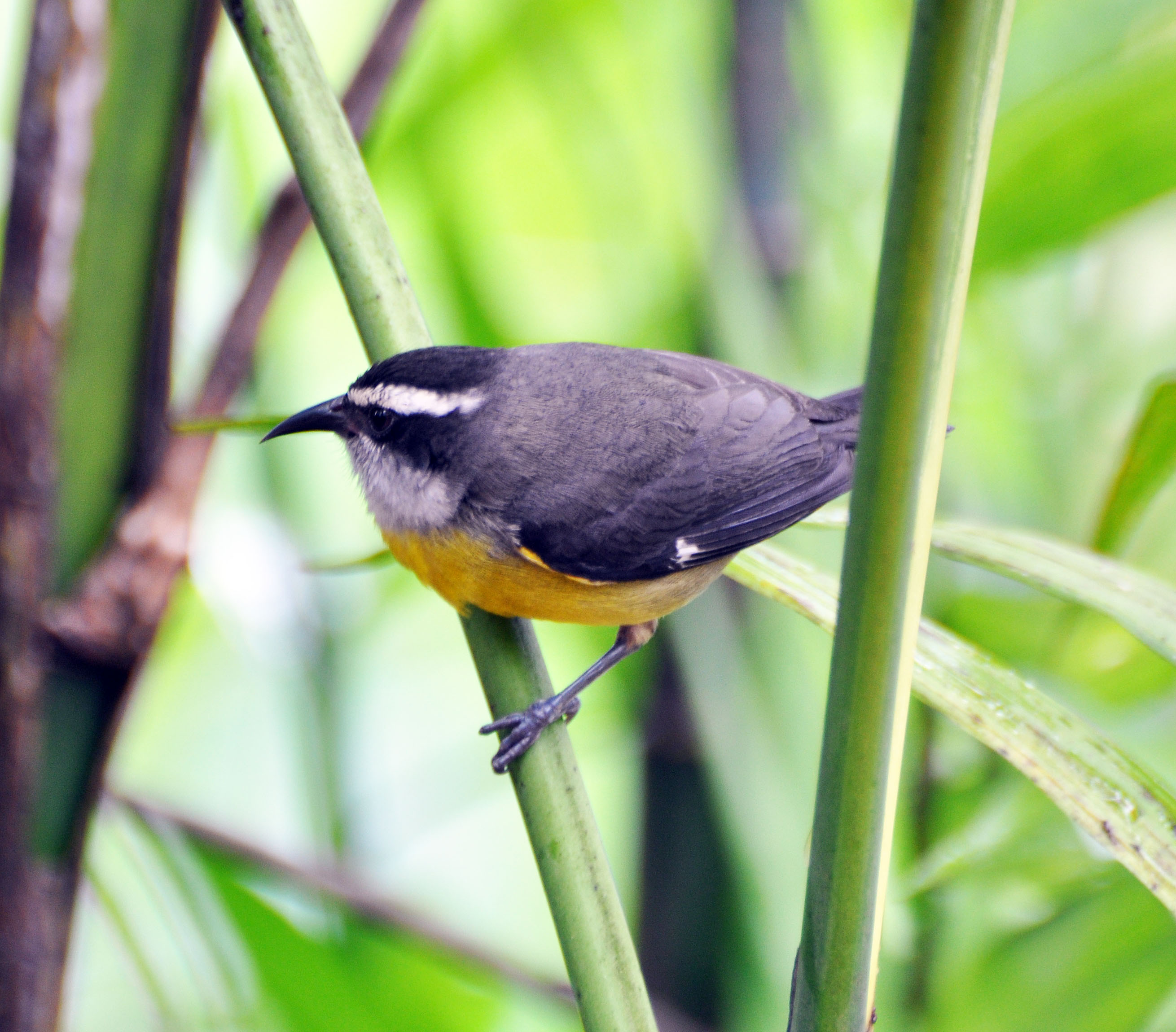
C. f. mexicana, Costa Rica

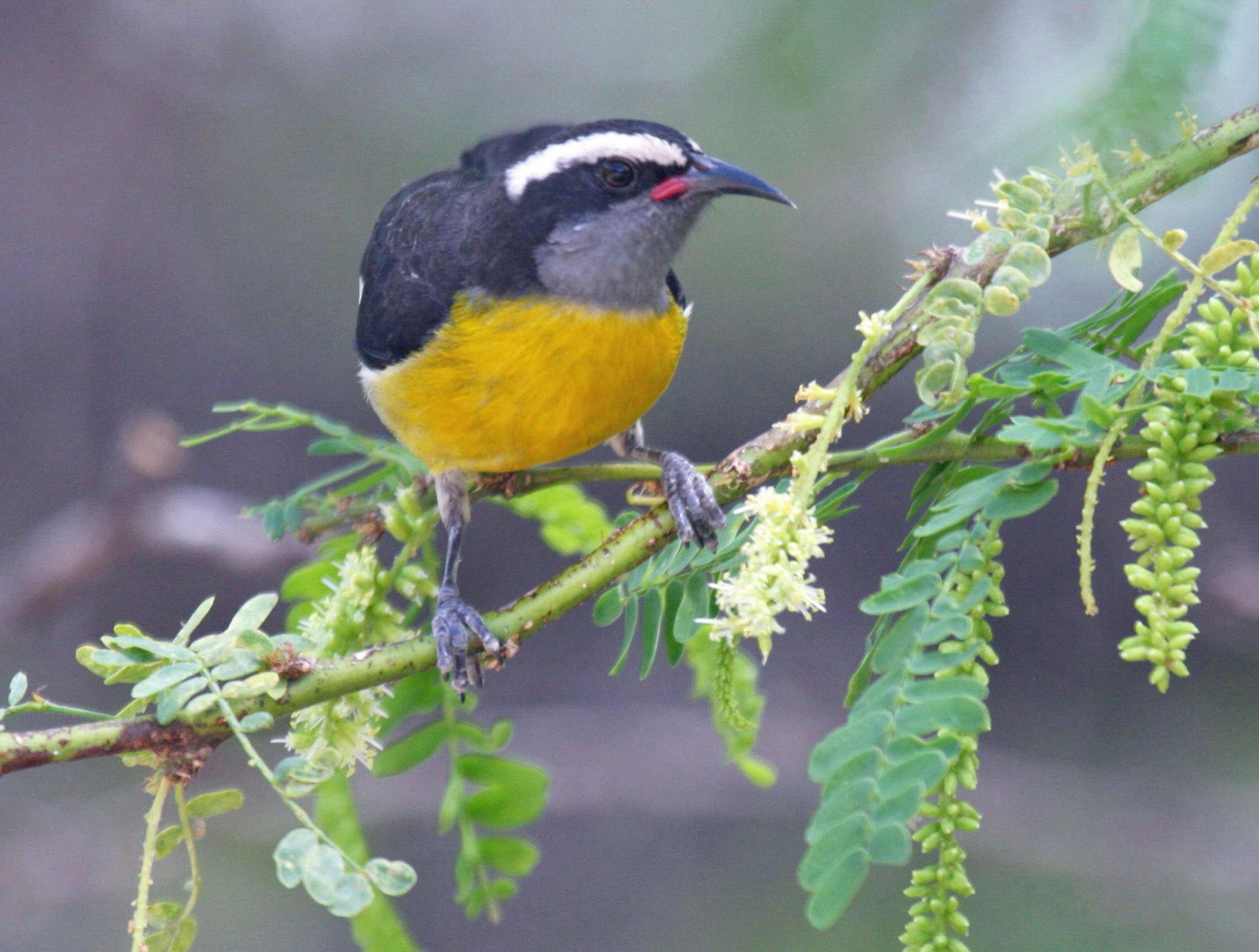
C. f. portoricensis, Puerto Rico

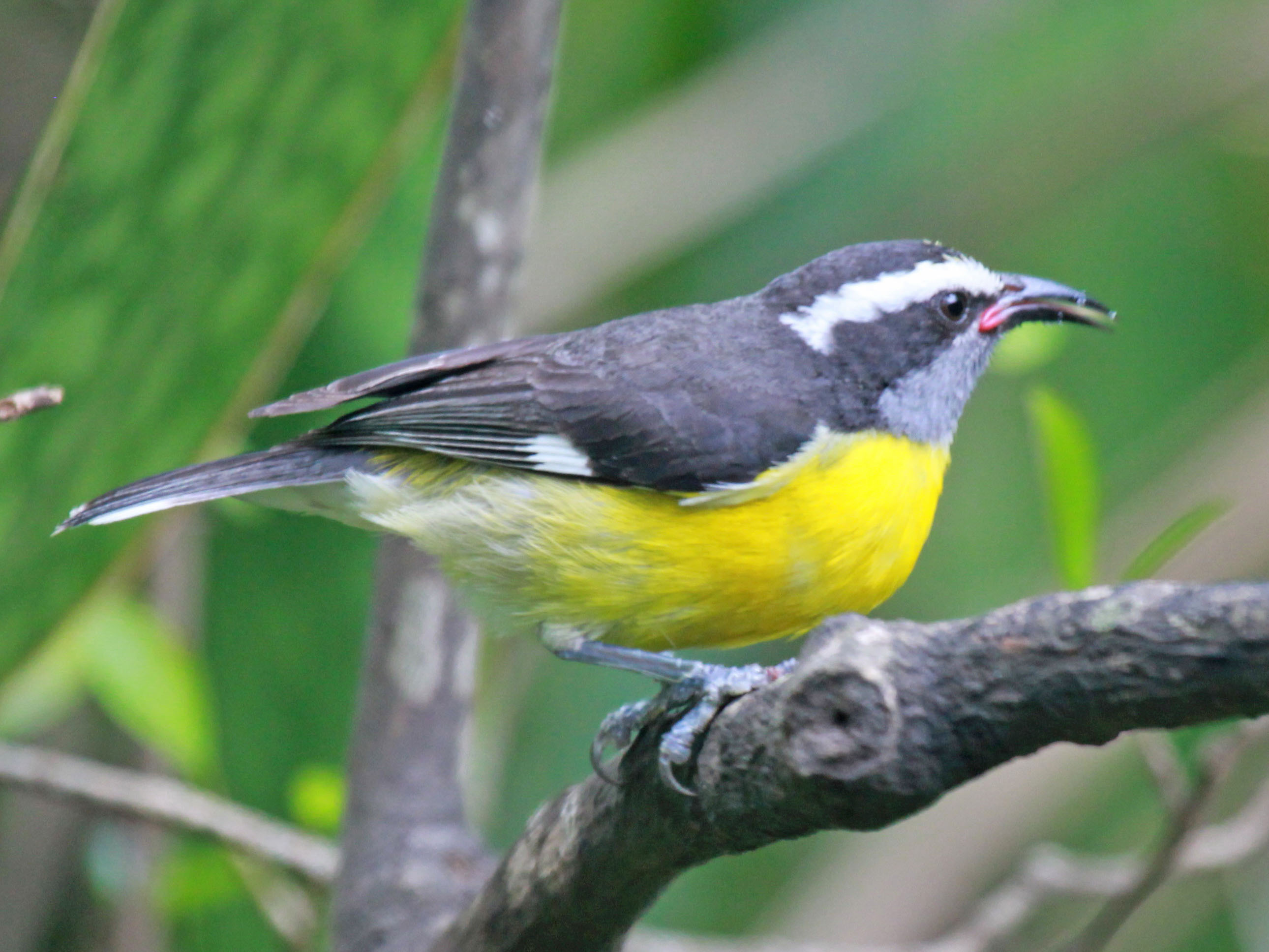
C. f. sanctithomae, Saint John, U.S. Virgin Islands

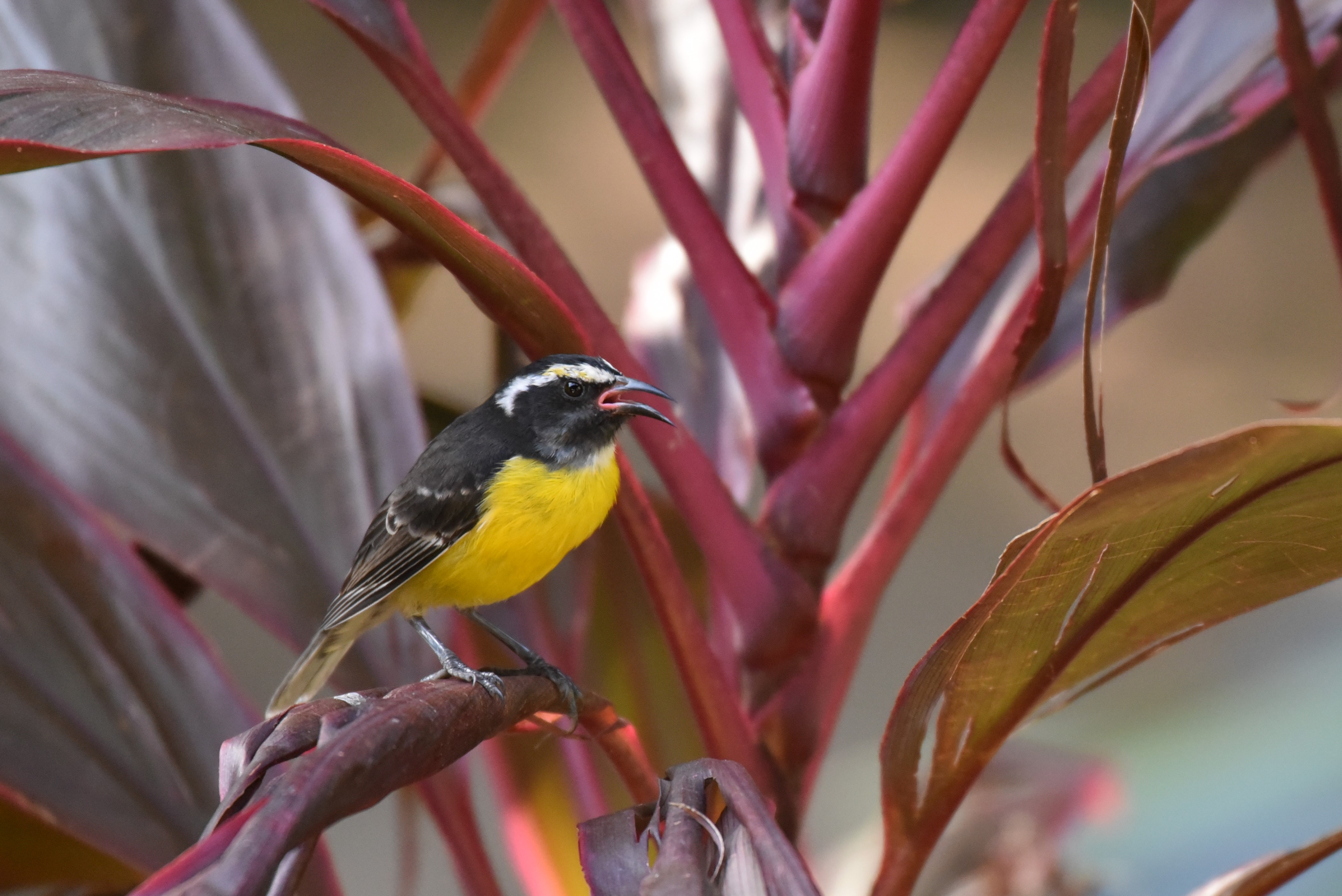
C. f. uropygialis, Aruba

== Description ==
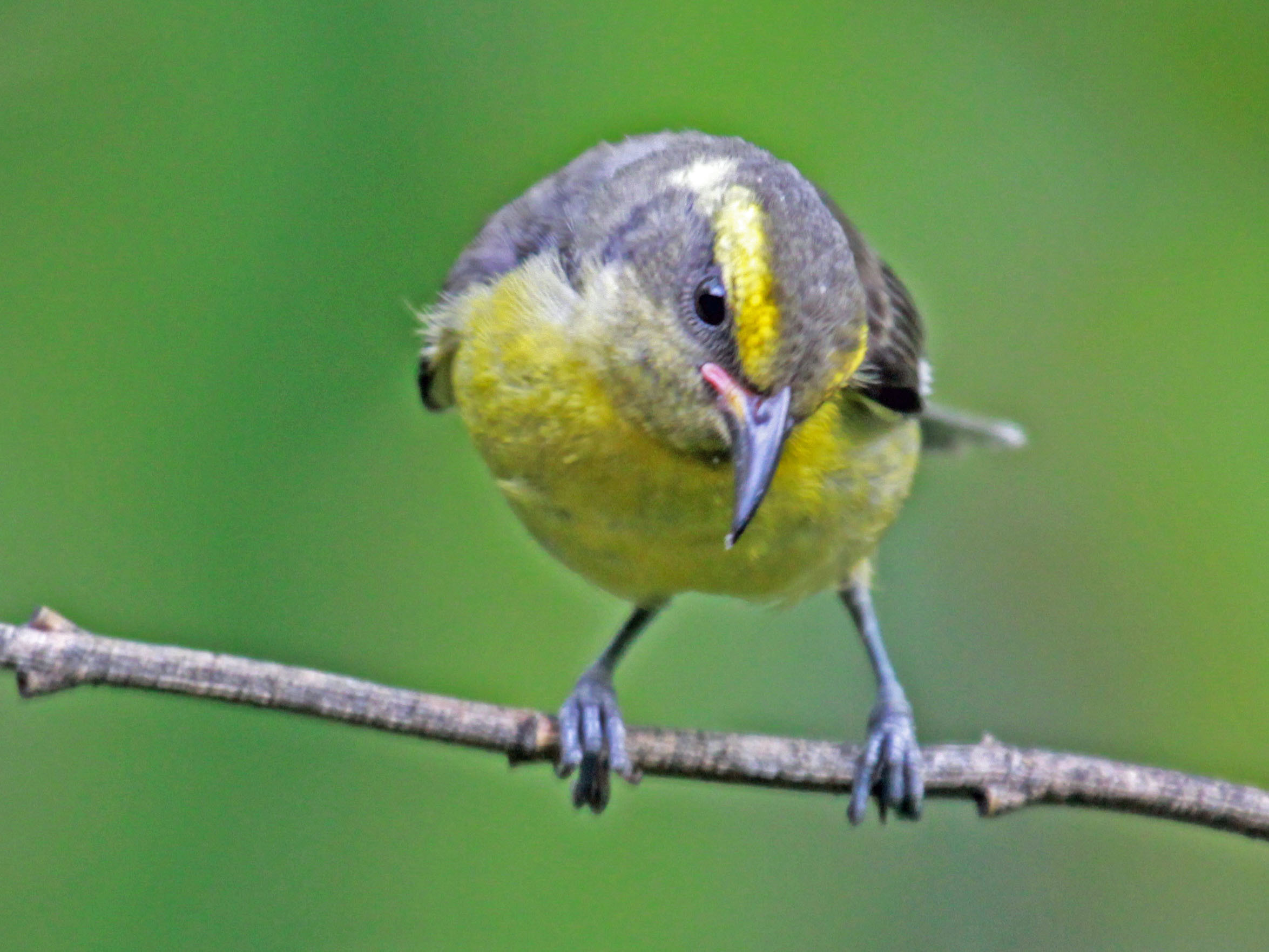
Juvenile bananaquits are duller than adults and may have yellow eyebrows and throat

The bananaquit is a small bird, although size varies somewhat across the subspecies. Length can range from 10 to 13 cm (3.9 to 5.1 in). Weight ranges from 5.5 to 19 g (0.19 to 0.67 oz).

Most subspecies of the bananaquit have dark grey (almost black) upperparts, black crowns and sides of the head, a prominent white eyestripe, grey throat, white vent, and yellow chest, belly, and rump. Coloration is heavily influenced by melanocortin 1 receptor variation.

The sexes are alike, but juveniles are duller and often have partially yellow eyebrows and throat.

In the subspecies bahamensis and caboti from the Bahamas and Cozumel, respectively, the throat and upper chest are white or very pale grey, while ferryi from La Tortuga Island has a white forehead. The subspecies laurae, lowii, and melanornis from small islands off the coast of northern Venezuela are overall blackish, while the subspecies aterrima and atrata from Grenada and Saint Vincent have two plumage morphs, one "normal" and another blackish. The pink gape is usually very prominent in the subspecies from islands in the Caribbean Sea.

The tongue is paddle-shaped, with an extremely long paddle section.

== Distribution and habitat ==
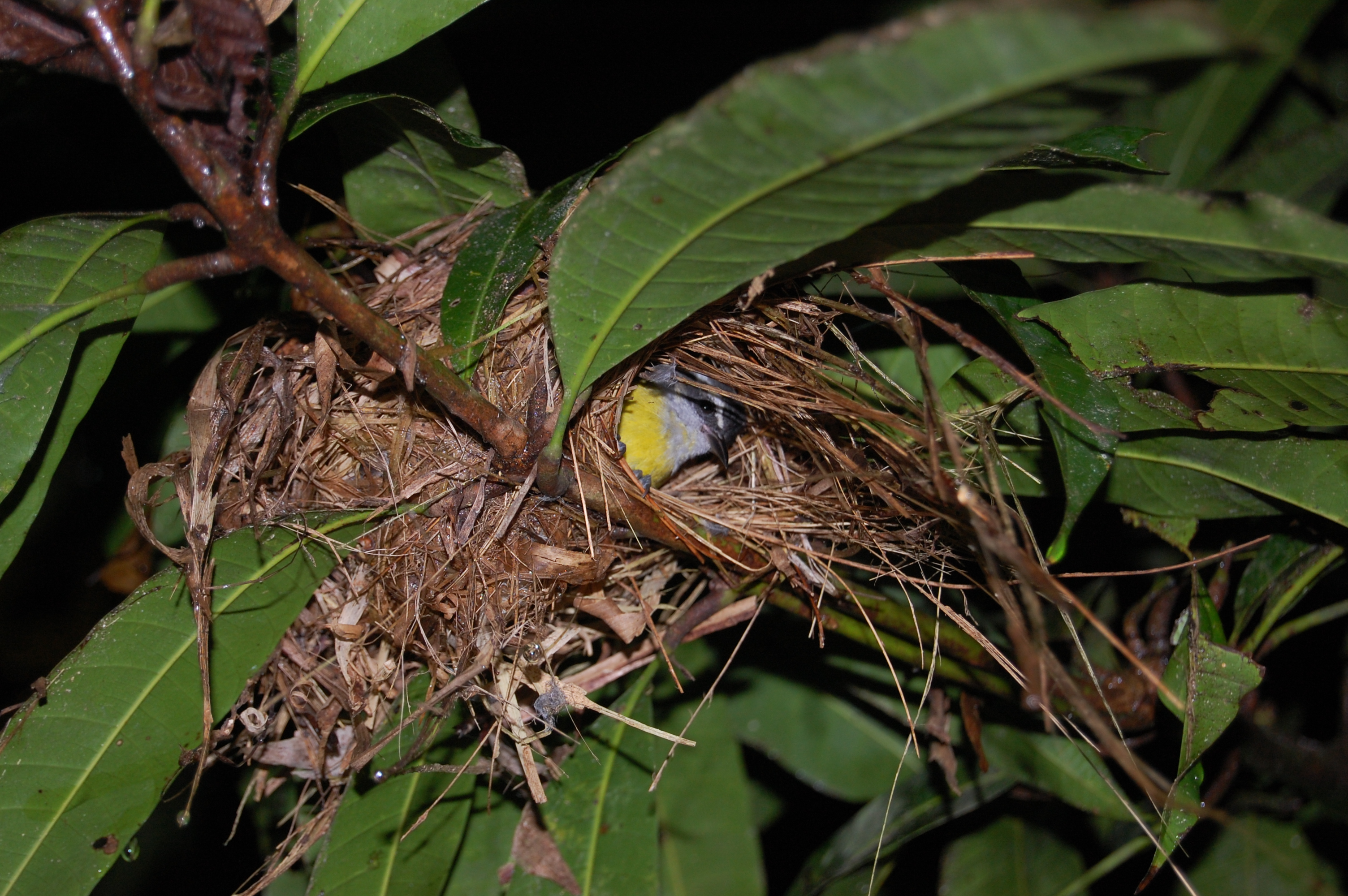
Bananaquit in its nest. Osa Peninsula, Costa Rica

It is resident in tropical South America north to southern Mexico and the Caribbean. It is found throughout the West Indies, except for Cuba. Birds from the Bahamas are rare visitors to Florida.

It occurs in a wide range of open to semi-open habitats, including gardens and parks, but it is rare or absent in deserts, dense forests (e.g. large parts of the Amazon rainforest), and at altitudes above 2,000 m (6,600 ft).

Bananaquit nests are known to be used by frog species, such as the Common coquí.

== Behaviour and ecology ==
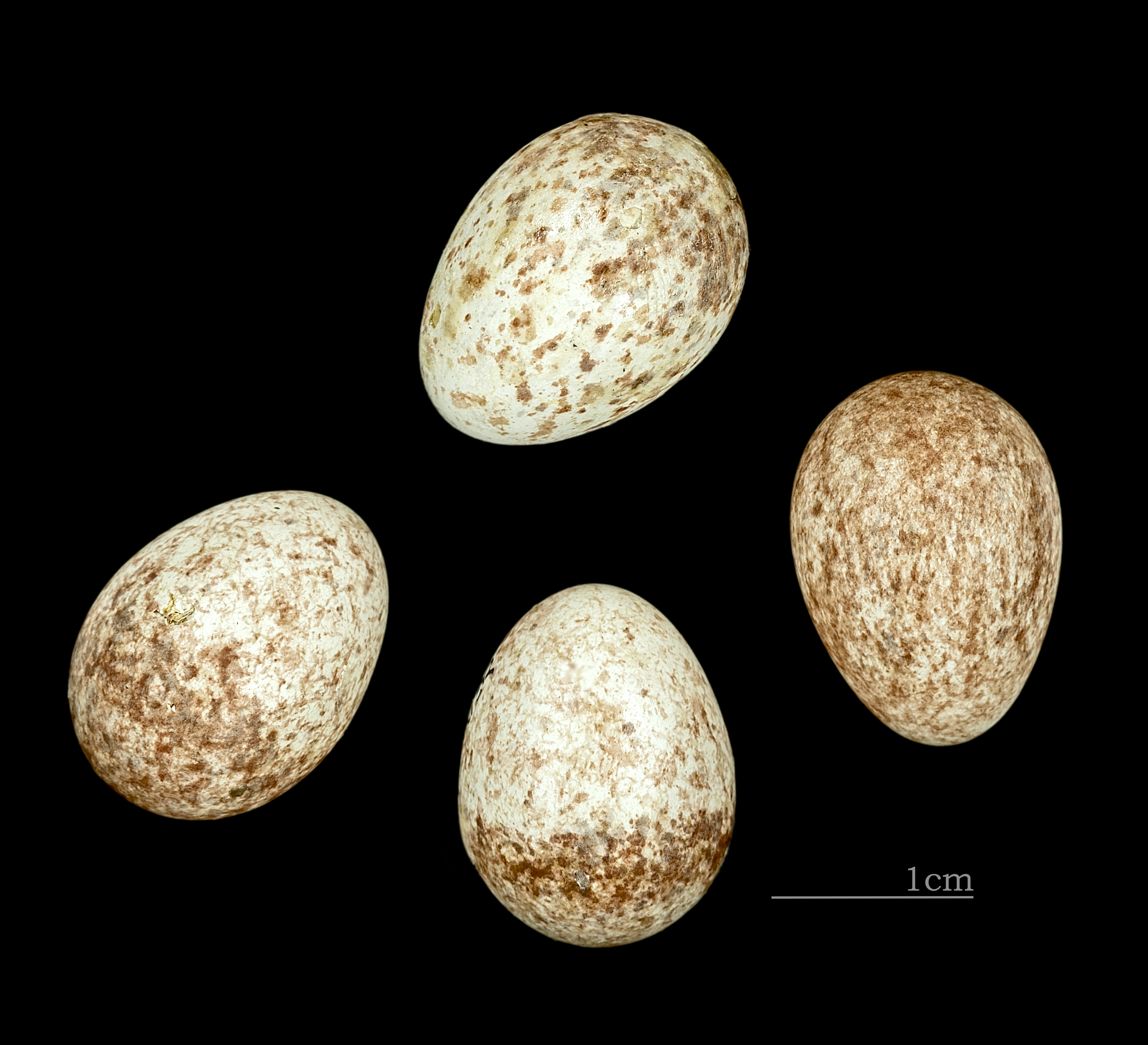
Eggs of Coereba flaveola MHNT

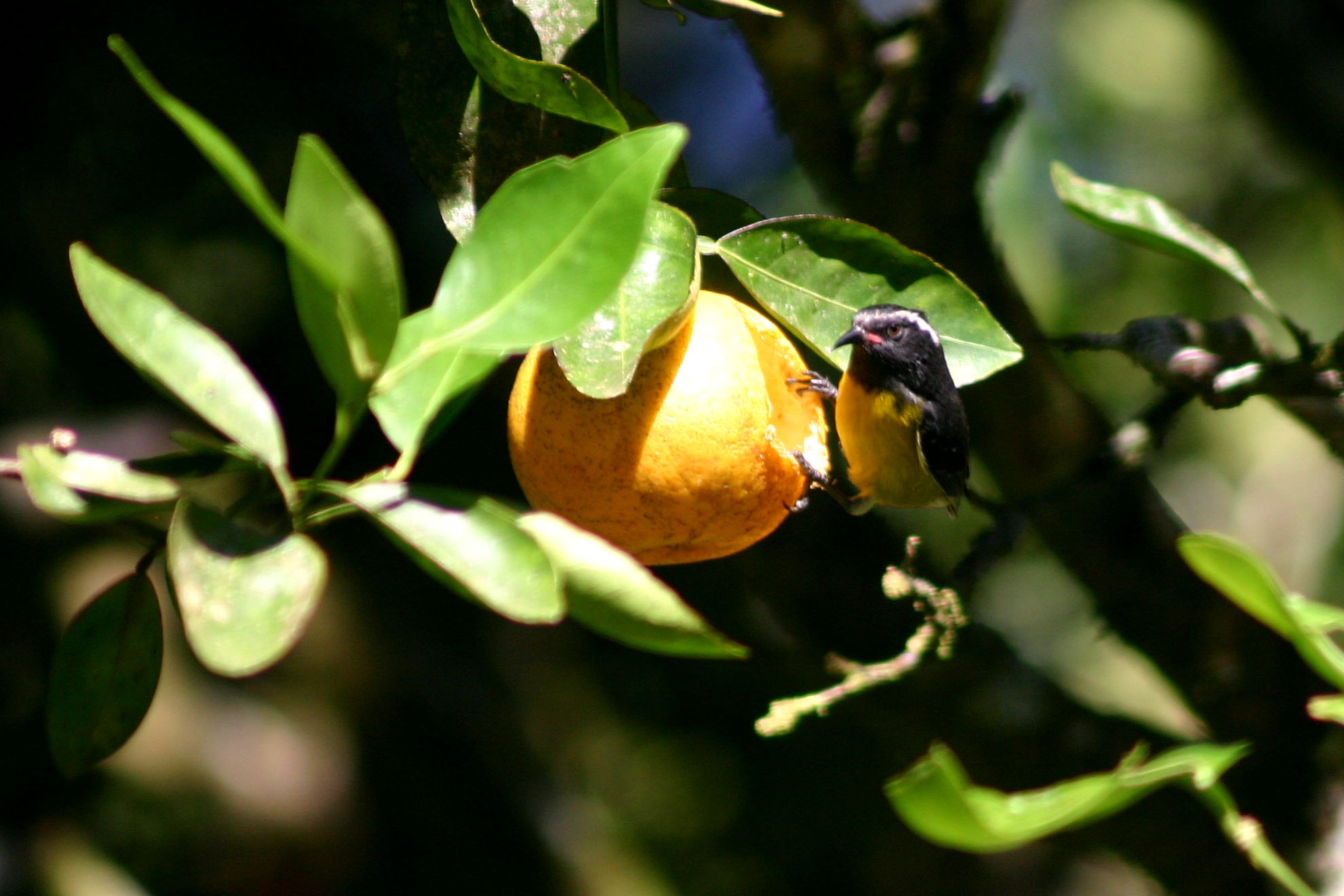
A bananaquit feeding on an orange in the Morne Diablotins National Park in Dominica

The bananaquit has a slender, curved bill, adapted to taking nectar from flowers, including mistletoes. Nectivory is probably an independent innovation in Coereba. Since then C. flaveola's tongue shape has shown convergent evolution with other birds feeding on the same flowers, and its source flowers have shown convergence to accommodate its tongue. It sometimes pierces flowers from the side, taking the nectar without pollinating the plant (nectar robbing). It also feeds on fruits, including mistletoe fruits, other berries, and ripe bananas (hence the common name and bananivora for the Hispaniolan subspecies). It has been observed taking fruits' sweet juices by puncturing fruit with its beak and also sometimes eats small insects (such as ants and flies), their larvae, and other small arthropods (such as spiders). While feeding, the bananaquit must perch, as it cannot hover like a hummingbird.

The bananaquit is known for its ability to adjust to human environments. It often visits gardens and may become very tame. Its nickname, the sugar bird, comes from its affinity for bowls or bird feeders stocked with granular sugar, a common method of attracting these birds. The bananaquit builds a spherical lined nest with a side entrance hole, laying up to three eggs, which are incubated solely by the female. It may also build its nest in human-made objects, such as lampshades and garden trellises. The birds breed all year and build new nests throughout the year.

== Literature cited ==
- Bellemain, Eva; Bermingham, Eldredge; Ricklefs, Robert E. (2008). "The dynamic evolutionary history of the bananaquit (Coereba flaveola) in the Caribbean revealed by a multigene analysis". BMC Evolutionary Biology. 8 (1): 240. Bibcode:2008BMCEE...8..240B. doi:10.1186/1471-2148-8-240. PMC 2533019. PMID 18718030.
- BirdLife International (2016). "Coereba flaveola". IUCN Red List of Threatened Species. 2016 e.T22722080A94747415. doi:10.2305/IUCN.UK.2016-3.RLTS.T22722080A94747415.en.
- Diamond, A. W. (1973). "Altitudinal variation in a resident and migrant passerine on Jamaica" (PDF). The Auk. 90 (3): 610–618. doi:10.2307/4084159. JSTOR 4084159.
- Dunning, John B. Jr (2001). "Bananaquit". In Elphick, Chris; Dunning, John B. Jr.; Sibley, David Allen (eds.). The Sibley Guide to Bird Life and Behavior. New York: Alfred A. Knopf. pp. 510–511. ISBN 978-1-4000-4386-6.
- Howell, S. N. G.; Webb, S. (1995). A Guide to the Birds of Mexico and Northern Central America. London: Oxford University Press. ISBN 0-19-854012-4.
- Linnaeus, C. (1758). Systema naturae per regna tria naturae, secundum classes, ordines, genera, species, cum characteribus, differentiis, synonymis, locis. Tomus I. Editio decima, reformata (in Latin). Stockholm: Laurentius Salvius. "C. nigra, uropygio pectoreque luteo, superciliis macula alarum rectricumque apicibus albis."
- Monteiro Pereira, José Felipe (2008). Aves e Pássaros Comuns do Rio de Janeiro [Common Birds of Rio de Janeiro] (in Portuguese). Rio de Janeiro: Technical Books. ISBN 978-85-61368-00-5.
- De Boer, Bart A. (1993). Our Birds. Willemstad: Stichting Dierenbescherming Curaçao. ISBN 978-99904-0-077-9.
- Raffaele, Herbert; Wiley, James; Garrido, Orlando; Keith, Allan; Raffaele, Janis (1998). A Guide to the Birds of the West Indies. Princeton: Princeton University Press. ISBN 978-0-691-08736-8.
- Restall, R. L.; Rodner, C.; Lentino, M. (2006). Birds of Northern South America – An Identification Guide. London: Christopher Helm. ISBN 0-7136-7242-0.
- Seutin, G; Klein, N. K.; Ricklefs, R. E.; Bermingham, E. (1994). "Historical biogeography of the bananaquit (Coereba flaveola) in the Caribbean region: a mitochondrial DNA assessment". Evolution. 48 (4): 1041–1061. doi:10.2307/2410365. JSTOR 2410365. PMID 28564451.
- Vieillot, Louis Pierre (1809). Histoire naturelle des oiseaux de l'Amérique septentrionale [Natural History of the Birds of Northern America] (in French). Paris: Desray.
