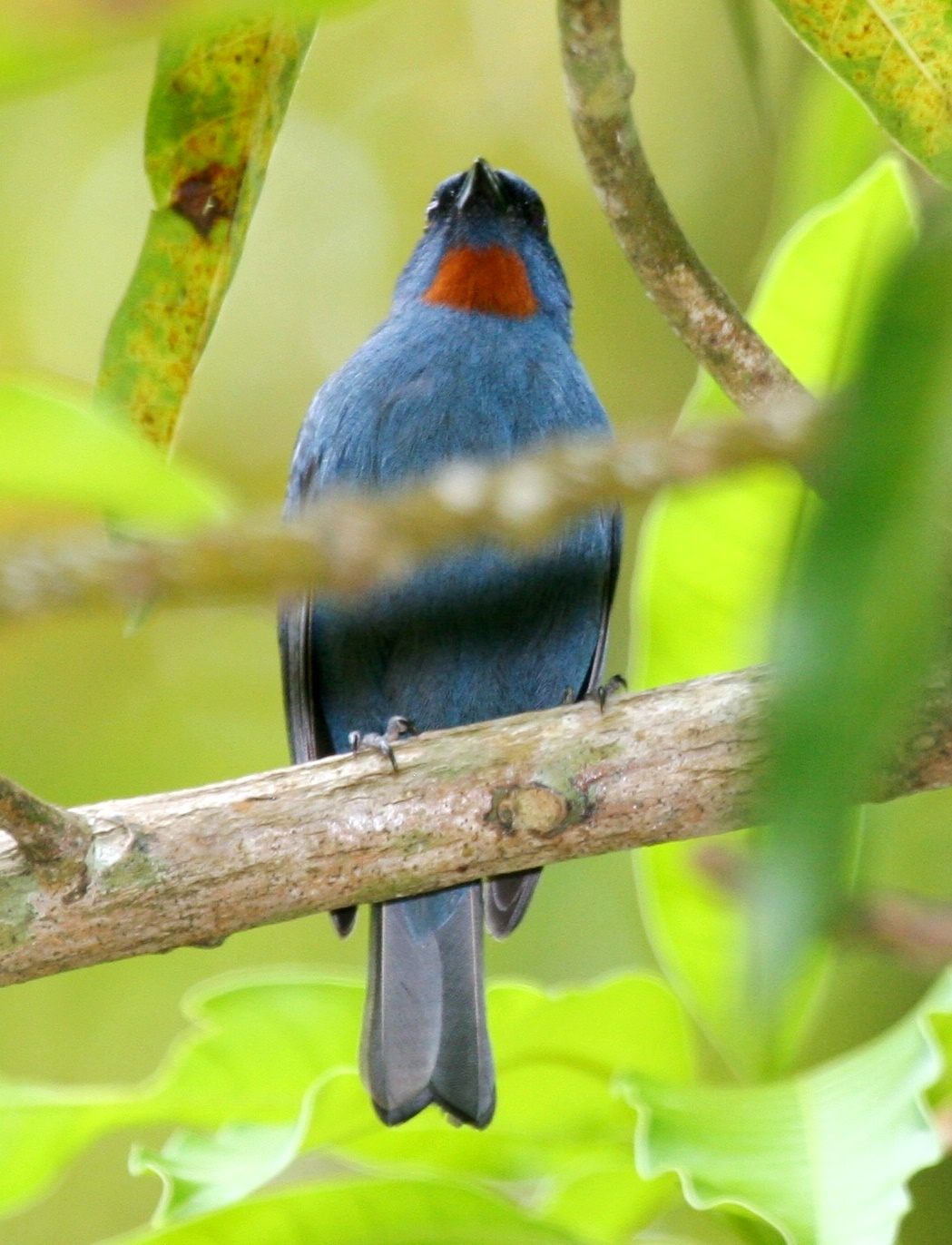
- Male

Conservation status
- Least Concern (IUCN 3.1)

Scientific classification
- Kingdom: Animalia
- Phylum: Chordata
- Class: Aves
- Order: Passeriformes
- Family: Thraupidae
- Genus: Euneornis; Fitzinger, 1856
- Species: E. campestris

Binomial name
- Euneornis campestris (Linnaeus, 1758)
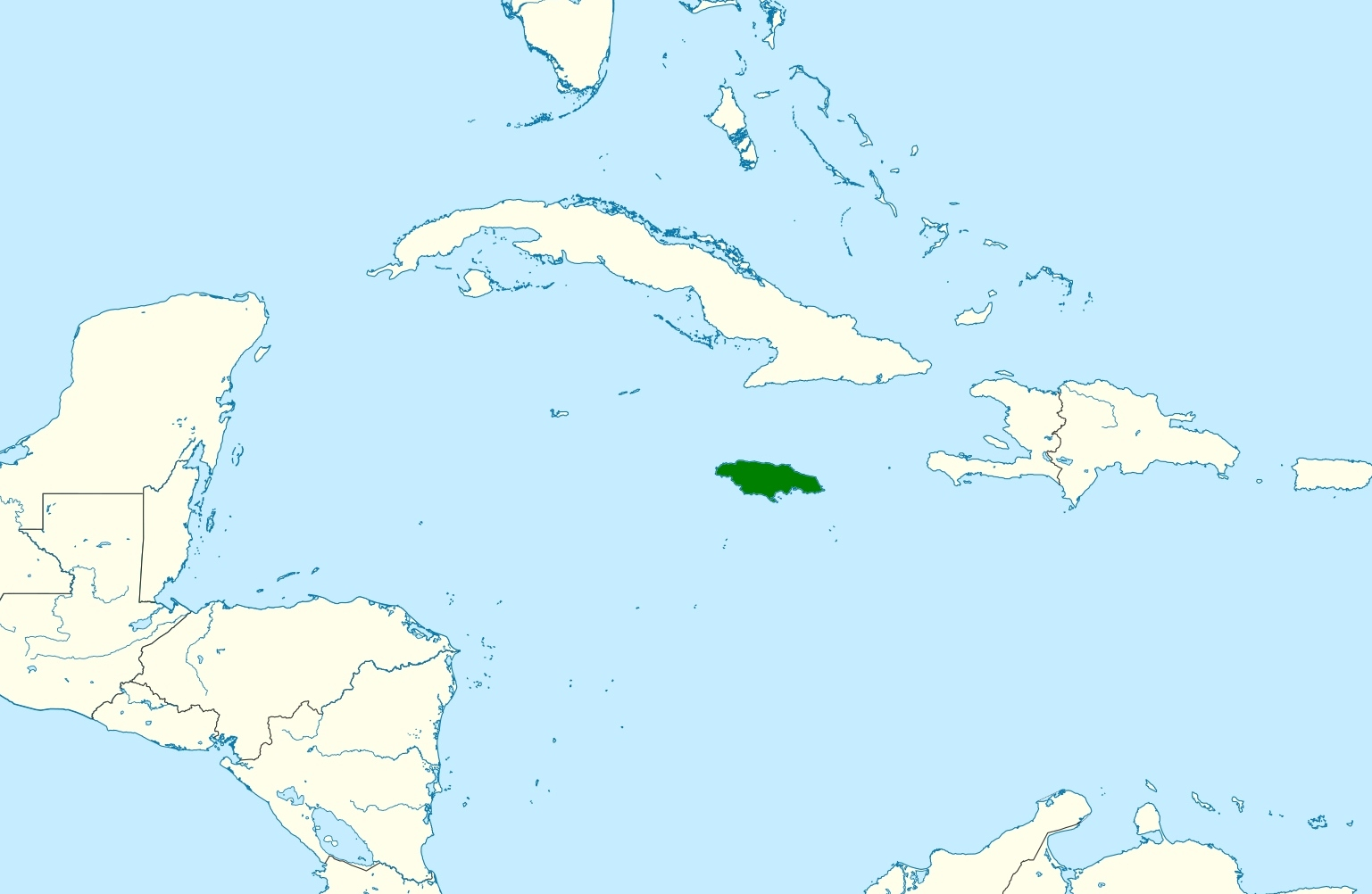
- range

Synonyms
- Motacilla campestris (protonym)

= Orangequit =

Genus of birds

The orangequit (Euneornis campestris) is a species of passerine bird in the family Thraupidae, the tanagers and allies. It is endemic to Jamaica.

== Taxonomy and systematics ==
The orangequit was formally described by the Swedish naturalist Carl Linnaeus in 1758 in the tenth edition of his Systema Naturae under the binomial name Motacilla campestris. Linnaeus based his description on the "American Hedge-Sparrow" that George Edwards had described and illustrated in his 1750 work, A Natural History of Uncommon Birds, from a specimen collected in Jamaica. The species was moved to the genus Euneornis by the Austrian zoologist Leopold Fitzinger in 1856. The genus name Euneornis combines the Ancient Greek eu meaning "good" with the genus Neornis introduced by Edward Blyth in 1845 and now a junior synonym of Cettia. The specific epithet campestris is Latin and means "of the fields".

The species' common name is derived from its orange throat and the English word quit, which refers to small passerines of tropical America; cf. grassquit, bananaquit.

The orangequit is the only member of its genus and has no subspecies.

== Description ==
The orangequit is 14 cm (5.5 in) long and weighs 13.2 to 19.2 g (0.47 to 0.68 oz). The species is sexually dimorphic. Adult males are gray-blue except for their orange-red throat. Adult females have an olive-gray crown and nape and an otherwise grayish white head. Their upperparts are a warmer brownish gray. Their underparts are grayish white with faint streaks overall and a light buffish wash on the flanks. Both sexes have a dark brown iris, a slightly decurved black bill, and black legs and feet. Juveniles are like adult females.

== Distribution and habitat ==
The orangequit is found throughout the island of Jamaica. It inhabits humid forest and woodlands and also shade coffee plantations. Sources differ on its maximum elevation. Two say it is 1,500 m (4,900 ft) and a third says the species is found "at all elevations". Two note that it is most common in middle elevations.

== Behavior ==
=== Movement ===
The orangequit is a sedentary year-round resident.

=== Feeding ===
The orangequit feeds primarily on nectar. It also includes fruit, seeds, and invertebrates in its diet and has been observed feeding on tree sap from holes drilled by Sphyrapicus sapsuckers. It forages singly or in pairs, usually between the forest's lower and mid-levels.

=== Breeding ===
The orangequit's breeding season is between April and June. Its nest is an open cup made from grass and other plant fibers and is typically in a tree or shrub up to about 6 m (20 ft) above the ground. The clutch is two to four eggs that are white with reddish- and gray-brown markings. The female alone incubates. The incubation period, time to fledging, and other details of parental care are not known.

=== Vocalization ===
The orangequit's call is a "thin, high-pitched tseet or swee".

== Status ==
The IUCN has assessed the orangequit as being of Least Concern. It has a limited range; its population size is not known but is believed to be stable. "The only potential threat to this species is the loss and fragmentation of forests within the range. However, tree cover loss is currently very low and unlikely to be driving any population declines." It is considered locally common throughout the island but is found "especially at Newwcastle, Hardwar Gap, Mandeville, and Anchovy".

== Gallery ==
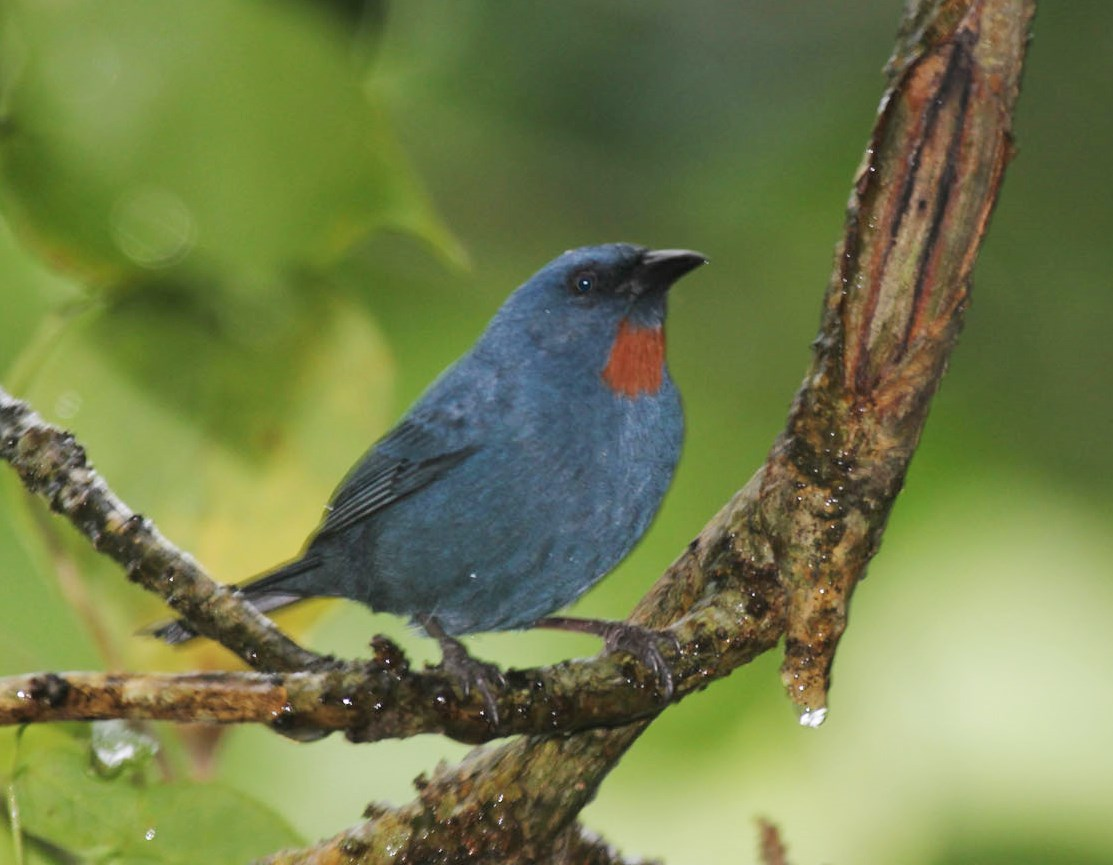
Male at Negril

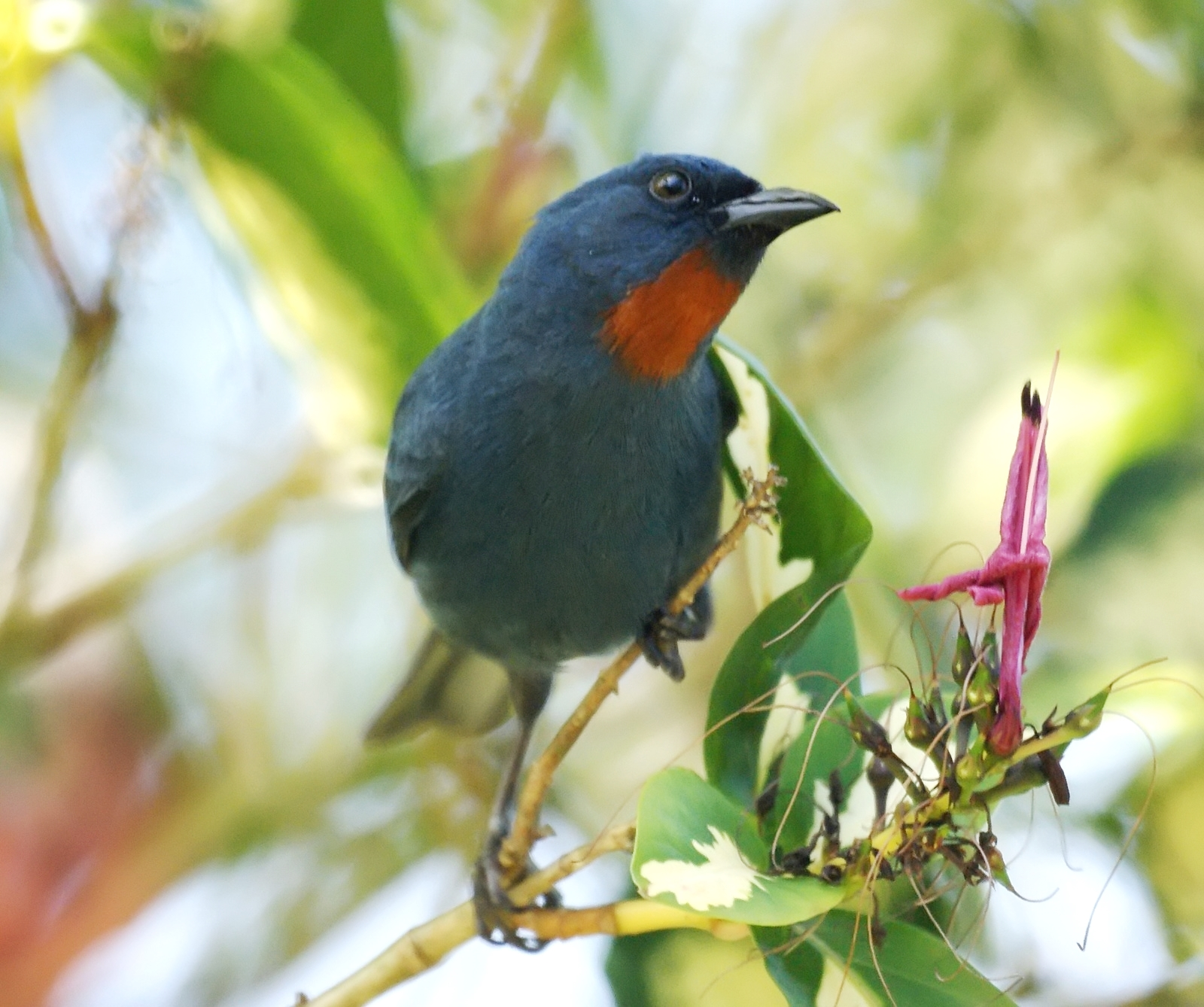
Male at Geejam

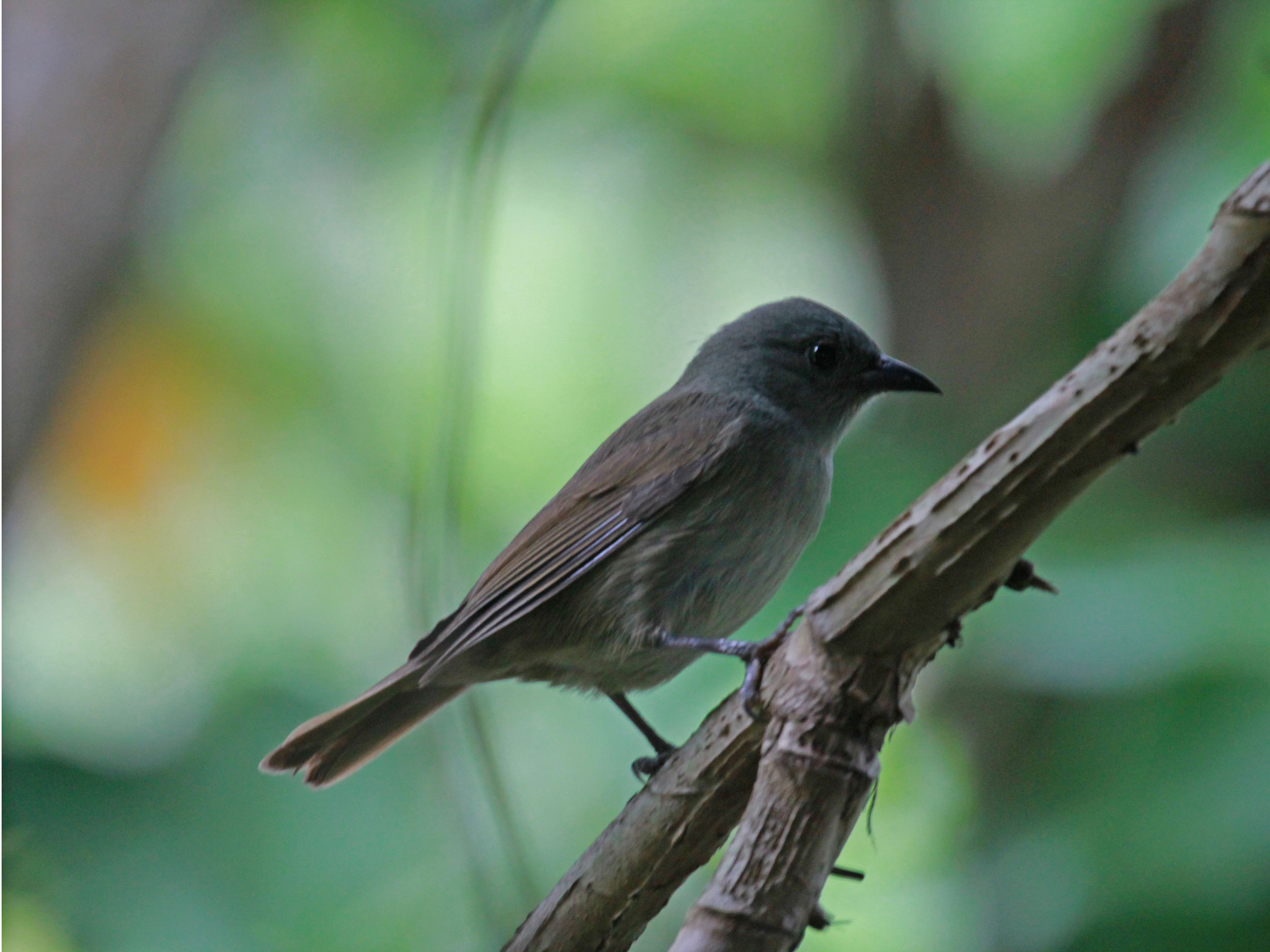
Female at Negril

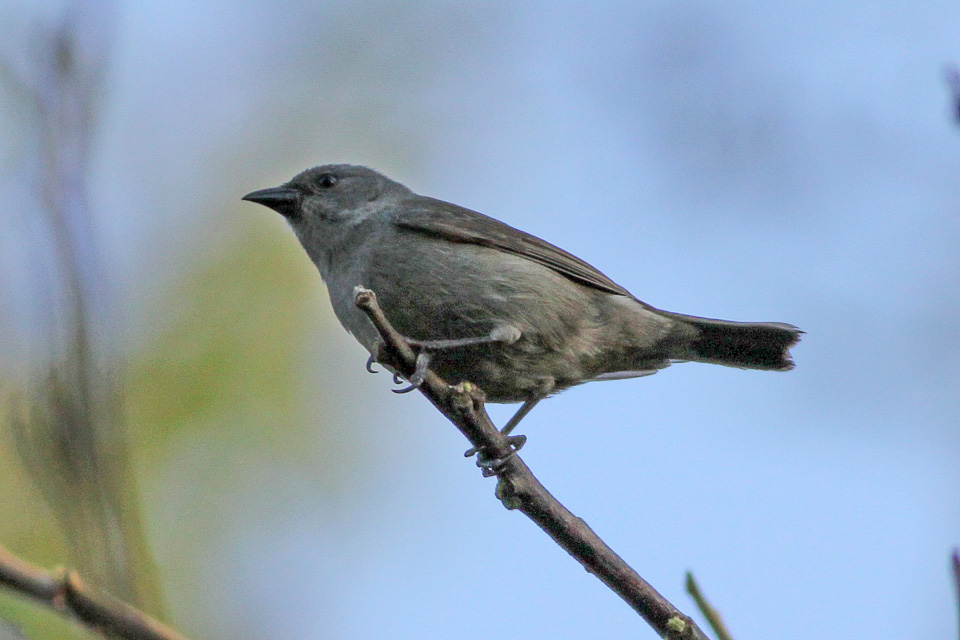
Female at Marshall's Pen
