= Boa Esperança, Minas Gerais =

Good Hope Boa Esperança
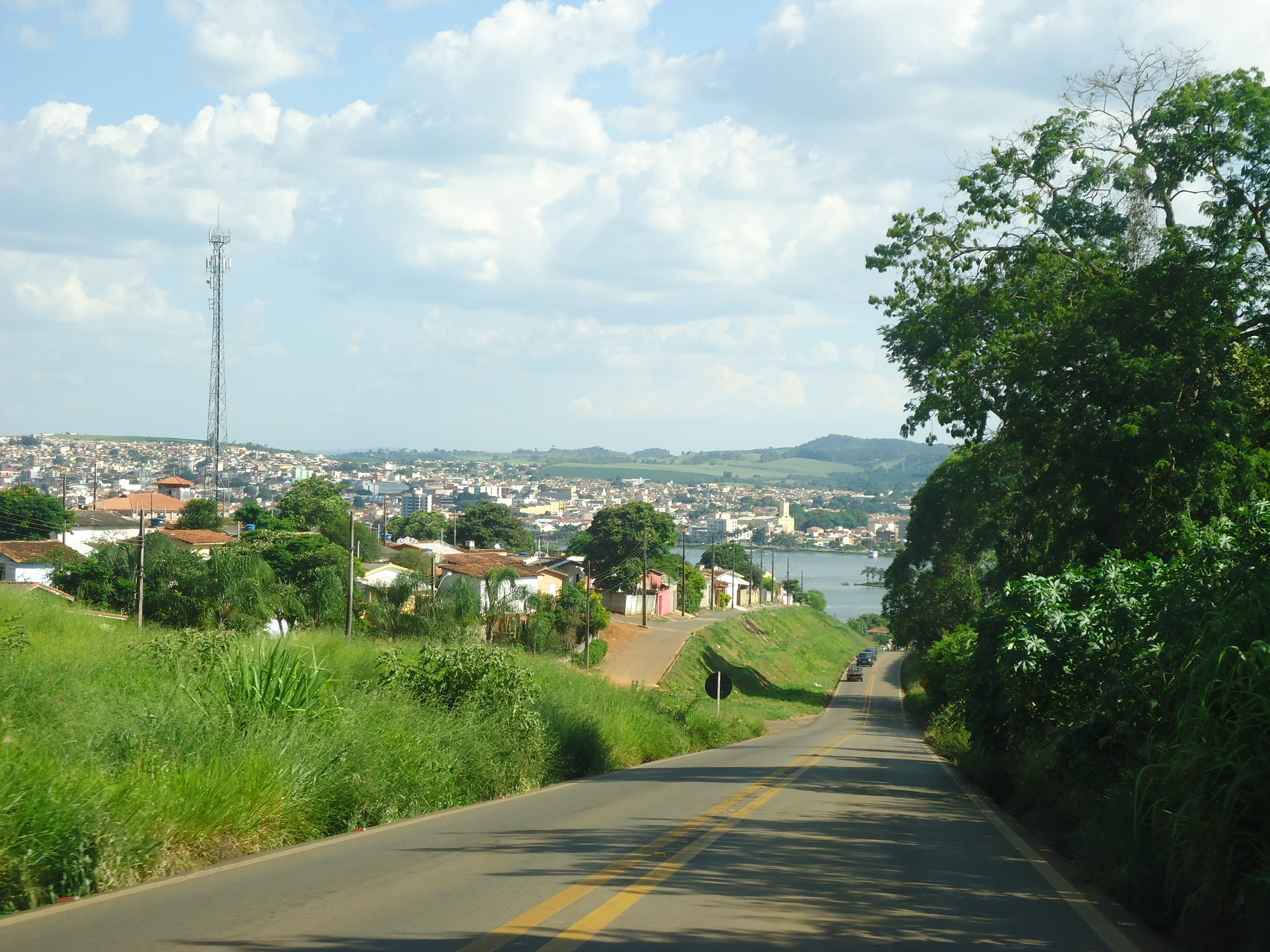

- Flag Coat of arms
- Nickname: Furnas City
- Motto: Uma cidade de todos (A City for All)
- Location of Boa Esperança within the State of Minas Gerais

- Location of Boa Esperança within Brazil
- Coordinates: 21°05′24″S 45°33′57″W
- Country: Brazil
- State: Minas Gerais
- Mesoregion: South and southeast of Minas
- Microregion: Varginha
- Established: October 15, 1869

Government
  - Mayor: Antonio Carlos Vilela (2013–2016) (PT)

Area
  - Total: 860.669 km^{2} (332.306 sq mi)
- Elevation: 775 m (2,543 ft)

Population (2020)
  - Total: 40,219
  - Density: 46.730/km^{2} (121.03/sq mi)
- Demonyms: Esperansense, Dorense
- Time zone: UTC−3 (BRT)
- Website: boaesperanca.mg.gov.br

Boa Esperança is a Brazilian municipality from the state of Minas Gerais. The municipality is located by the Serra da Boa Esperança, which became celebrated through song that brings its name, compounded by Lamartine Babo and performed by several singers. Across its territory passes Rio Grande, important to the development of the region. The economy of Boa Esperança is based on coffee plantations and tourism.

== History ==
The municipality of Boa Esperança (English: Good Hope) came up with gold rush of the late 19th century. The first settlement was established in 1778, and in 1804 it was called 'Dores do Pântano (English: Pain Swamp). In 1814 started the construction of the Church, and at that time arose the first coffee plantations, which marked a phase of wealth and progress for the parish. In 1866 the parish was elevated by provincial law to the status of village. On 15 November 1868, the seat of local government was built and the village was elevated by Provincial Law No. 1611 to the status of municipality. In 1957–1958, with the construction of the Furnas Dam and subsequently of the Furnas Lake, the town began to grow as a result of tourism.

== Geography ==
Boa Esperança is located in the southern-tropical part of Brazil, at 21 degrees, 5 minutes, 24 second south, and 45 degrees, 33 minutes, 57 seconds west, at an altitude of 775 metres (2,543 ft), in the internal part of the State of Minas Gerais. It covers an area of 860.669 square kilometres (332.306 sq mi).

=== Climate ===
Situated on the southern outskirts of the tropical zone and under the influence of the high elevation of the region, the climate type is tropical mesothermal with an average annual rainfall of about 1,500 millimetres (59 in). The annual temperature is 19 °C (66 °F). Summer and spring are the hottest seasons with a maximum daily temperature ranging from 25 to 29 °C (77 to 84 °F). November, December, and January are the warmest months reaching 36–37 °C (97–99 °F) and with a minimum temperature of 9–10 °C (48–50 °F).

=== Rivers ===
Grande River, a tributary of the Paraná River, Ribeirão São Pedro, Ribeirão das Três Pontas, Ribeirão Marimbondo, Ribeirão da Maricota. The Furnas Dam borders the municipality.

=== Fauna and flora ===
Boa Esperança is home to several species of birds such as darters, herons, roadside hawks, moorhens, lapwings, jabirus, kingfishers, and grassquits.

Among the mammals in the area there are capybara, brocket deer, monkey, fox, otter, paca, agouti, megabat, skunk, and others. Some of these species may have migrated from other areas.

In this area there are forests and araucarias rich in vegetation, including mimosa, cedrus, cinnamomum, sassafras, manilkara bidentata, morus, Hymenaea courbaril, copaiba, Swietenia macrophylla, and Balfourodendron riedelianum. In riparian forests there are croton, inga, and pine. Scattered trees, shrubs and sub-shrubs present Annona crassiflora, Stryphnodendron adstringens, Stenocalyx dysentericus, Tabebuia ochracea, Kielmeyera coriacea.

== Demography ==
Its population in 2020 was 40,219 inhabitants.

== Government and politics ==
- Mayor: Antonio Carlos Vilela (Workers' Party) (2013–2016)
- Mayor: Hideraldo Henrique Silva (PMDB) (2017–2020)
- Mayor: Hideraldo Henrique Silva (MDB) (2021–2024)
- Mayor: Aroldo Rosa De Medeiros Junior (Avante) (2025–2028)

== Economy ==
Boa Esperança is an agro-pastoral Municipality. It produces grain, rice, garlic, potatoes, beans, maize, sugarcane, cassava, soybean, tomatoes, several species of fruit, and coffee. Coffee is the main product and it has a good level of production. It is consumed domestically and exported to other countries. Livestock, domestic pigs, and poultry are some of the oldest economic activities in the area. Trade, the "royalties" paid by Furnas Central Electric, and tourism are among the main activities of the tertiary sector.

== Transport ==
- BR-369 highway
- MG-167

== See also ==
- List of municipalities in Minas Gerais
