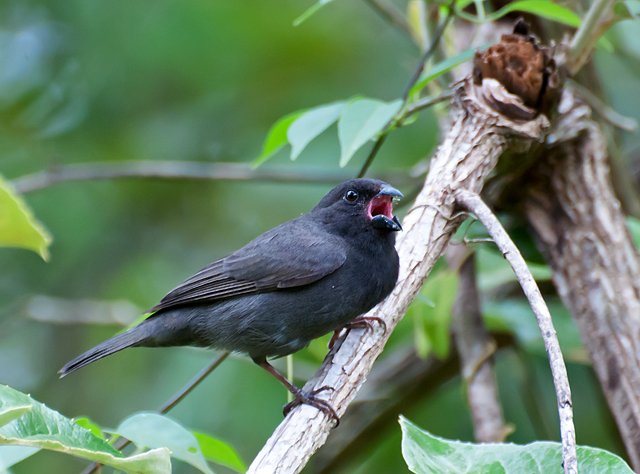
- Sooty grassquit (Asemospiza fuliginosa)

Scientific classification
- Kingdom: Animalia
- Phylum: Chordata
- Class: Aves
- Order: Passeriformes
- Family: Thraupidae
- Genus: Asemospiza; Burns, Unitt & Mason, 2016

Type species
- Fringilla fuliginosa Wied, 1830

Species
- See text

= Asemospiza =

Genus of birds

Asemospiza is a genus of South American birds in the tanager family Thraupidae.

== Taxonomy and species list ==
These species were formerly placed in the genus Tiaris. A molecular phylogenetic study published in 2014 found that Tiaris was polyphyletic. In the resulting reorganization to create monophyletic genera, these two species were assigned to a new genus Asemospiza with the sooty grassquit as the type species. The name combines the Ancient Greek ἄσημος (asēmos) meaning "without marks" and σπίζα (spíza) meaning "finch". These two species are in the subfamily Coerebinae and form a sister clade to the Darwin's finches.

TThe genus contains the following two species:

Image	Scientific name	Common name	Distribution
	Asemospiza fuliginosa	Sooty grassquit	Argentina, Bolivia, Brazil, Colombia, Guyana, Paraguay, Trinidad and Tobago, and Venezuela
	Asemospiza obscura	Dull-coloured grassquit	Venezuela to Argentina
