= Grassquit =

Group of birds

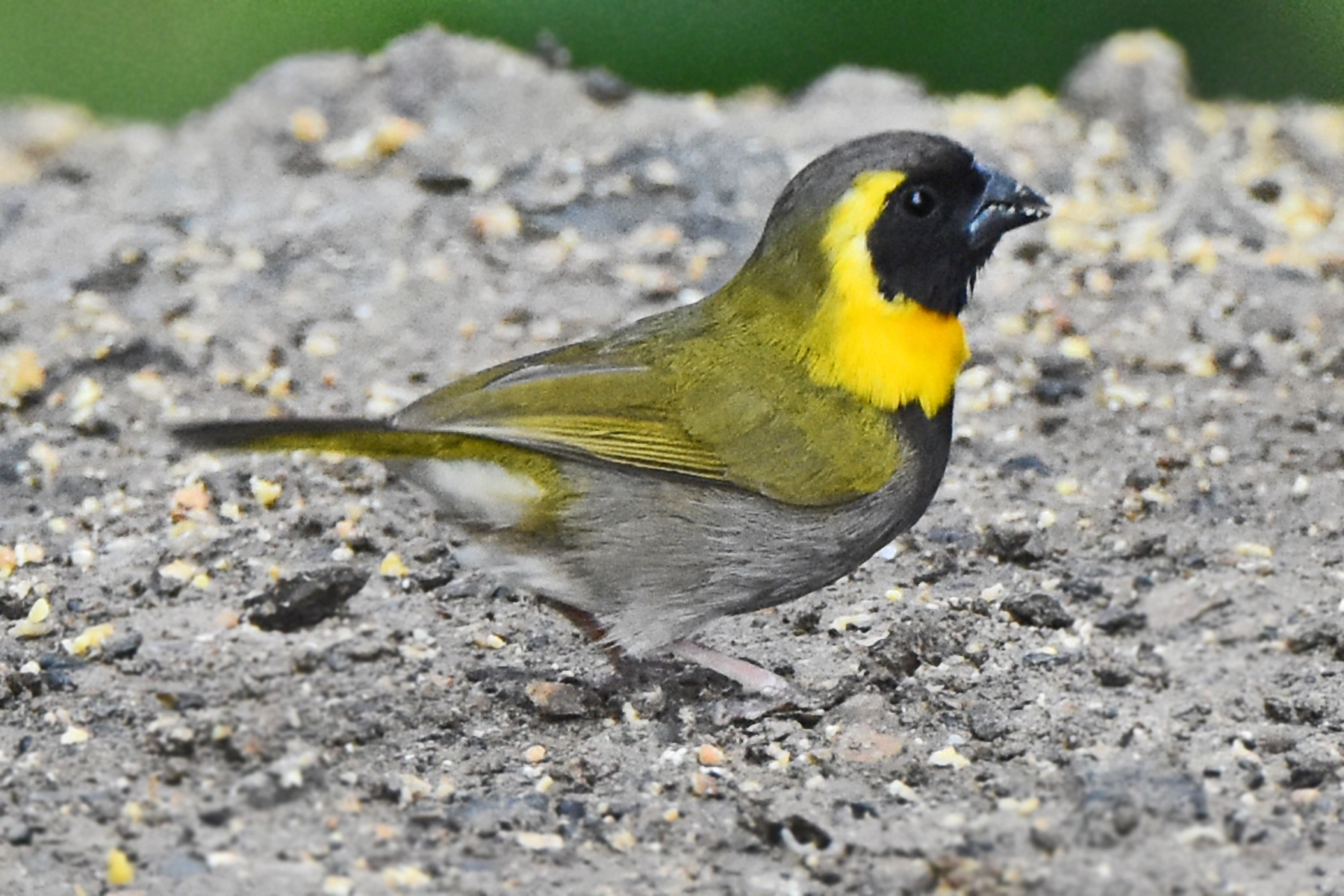
Cuban grassquit

Grassquits are small tropical birds currently placed in the tanager family, Thraupidae, although they had earlier been thought to be of the family Emberizidae. They are common in the West Indies and in Central and South American countries around the Caribbean Sea.

- Cuban grassquit (Phonipara canora)
- Sooty grassquit (Asemospiza fuliginosa)
- Dull-coloured grassquit (Asemospiza obscura)
- Yellow-faced grassquit (Tiaris olivaceus)
- Black-faced grassquit (Melanospiza bicolor)
- Yellow-shouldered grassquit (Loxipasser anoxanthus)
- Blue-black grassquit (Volatinia jacarina)
