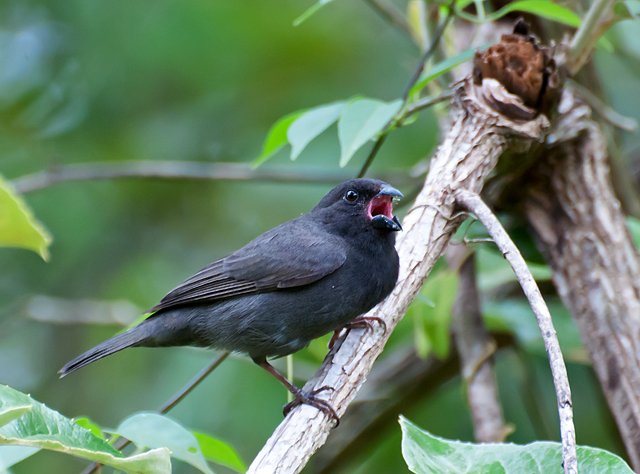
- In Piraju, São Paulo, Brazil

Conservation status
- Least Concern (IUCN 3.1)

Scientific classification
- Kingdom: Animalia
- Phylum: Chordata
- Class: Aves
- Order: Passeriformes
- Family: Thraupidae
- Genus: Asemospiza
- Species: A. fuliginosa

Binomial name
- Asemospiza fuliginosa (Wied, 1830)

Synonyms
- See text

= Sooty grassquit =

Species of bird

The sooty grassquit (Asemospiza fuliginosa) is a small bird in the family Thraupidae, the tanagers and allies. It is found in Argentina, Brazil, Colombia, Guyana, Paraguay, Trinidad, Venezuela, and as a vagrant to Bolivia.

== Taxonomy and systematics ==
The sooty grassquit was formally described in 1830 with the binomial Fringilla fuliginosa. By 1970 it had been reassigned to the genus Tiaris. Based on studies published in 2014 and 2015, in 2016 Burns et al. erected the genus Asemospiza with the sooty grassquit as the type species and including the dull-colored grassquit (A. obscura). The genus is closely related to Darwin's finches.

The sooty grassquit is monotypic.

== Description ==
The sooty grassquit is 10 to 11.4 cm (3.9 to 4.5 in) long and weighs 11 to 16 g (0.39 to 0.56 oz). The species is sexually dimorphic. Adult males are sooty blackish with an olive tinge on the back and slightly paler underparts. Adult females are a rich olive-brown that is darker on their upperparts than underparts. Both sexes have a dark iris, dark legs and feet, and a dark bill though the female's is slightly lighter. Juveniles are like adult females.

== Distribution and habitat ==
The sooty grassquit has an extremely disjunct distribution. It is found on Trinidad but not Tobago. Separate populations are in northern Colombia's isolated Sierra Nevada de Santa Marta, the northern end of the country's Central Andes, and the western slope of the Eastern Andes. Another is in the Serranía del Perijá that straddles the Colombia-Venezuela border. In Venezuela it is on the eastern slope of the Andes in northwestern Barinas and southeastern Lara states, in eastern Falcón, and intermittently in the Coastal Ranges from Carabobo to western Sucre states. A population extends from Venezuela's extreme eastern Bolívar state slightly into western Guyana and another is in southern Guyana. It has several ranges in Brazil. The largest extends along the country's southeast from Pernambuco to Santa Catarina and from there west into eastern Paraguay and far northeastern Argentina's Misiones Province. There is also a small population in western Mato Grosso and in several scattered locations in the Amazon Basin. The species has also been observed as a vagrant in Bolivia.

The sooty grassquit inhabits the edges of moist to humid forest, grassy areas in the forest and outside it, and regrowing burned areas. In elevation it is found from sea level to 600 m (2,000 ft) in Trinidad, between 1,000 and 1,500 m (3,300 and 4,900 ft) in Colombia, between 800 and 1,700 m (2,600 and 5,600 ft) in Venezuela, and from sea level to 1,500 m (4,900 ft) in Brazil.

== Behavior ==
=== Movement ===
The sooty grassquit is not a conventional migrant though it wanders into burned areas and in search of seeding bamboo. During the wet season in Trinidad it moves to higher elevations.

=== Feeding ===
The sooty grassquit feeds primarily on the seeds of bamboo. It is known to feed on Guadua and Chusquea seeds and suspected to also feed on those of Merostachys. It feeds on smaller amounts of grass seeds and some fruit. It forages singly and in pairs during the breeding season; outside that it can be in flocks that number about 40 individuals.

=== Breeding ===
The sooty grassquit's breeding season has not been fully established. In Argentina it includes August and in Trinidad spans at least July to December but occasionally begins as early as May. The season in any one area appears tied to the seeding of the local bamboo. Its nest is a ball with a side entrancem made from grasses and rootlets with a lining of softer fibers. It can be on a variety of substrates such as atop a stump, on the ground, or in a tree fork up to about 10 m (33 ft) above the ground. The clutch is usually two or three eggs though four are known; they are white with brown markings. Both parents provision nestlings. The incubation period, time to fledging, and other details of parental care are not known.

=== Vocalization ===
The sooty grassquit's song is a "simple, extr. high, fast variation on zizi-tsuur-sjree. Another rendition is "a thin, wiry ezz'u'da'leé, slurred together quickly, has [a] peculiar buzzy ('grease on a hot skillet') quality". Its call is chee.

== Status ==
The IUCN has assessed the sooty grassquit as being of Least Concern. It has a large range; its population size is not known but is believed to be stable. No immediate threats have been identified. Sources differ on its abundance in Colombia. One says the species is "uncommon and local". A more recent one says there is a single confirmed record in the country and that other records were probably of the dull-colored grassquit. It also says there are single confirmed records in Bolivia and Paraguay. In Venezuela it is "not well known [and] unpredictable in occurrence". It is "uncommon to rare" in southeastern Brazil and has only a few records elsewhere in the country. Its "[e]ruptive behaviour makes [its] true status in many areas difficult to assess".
