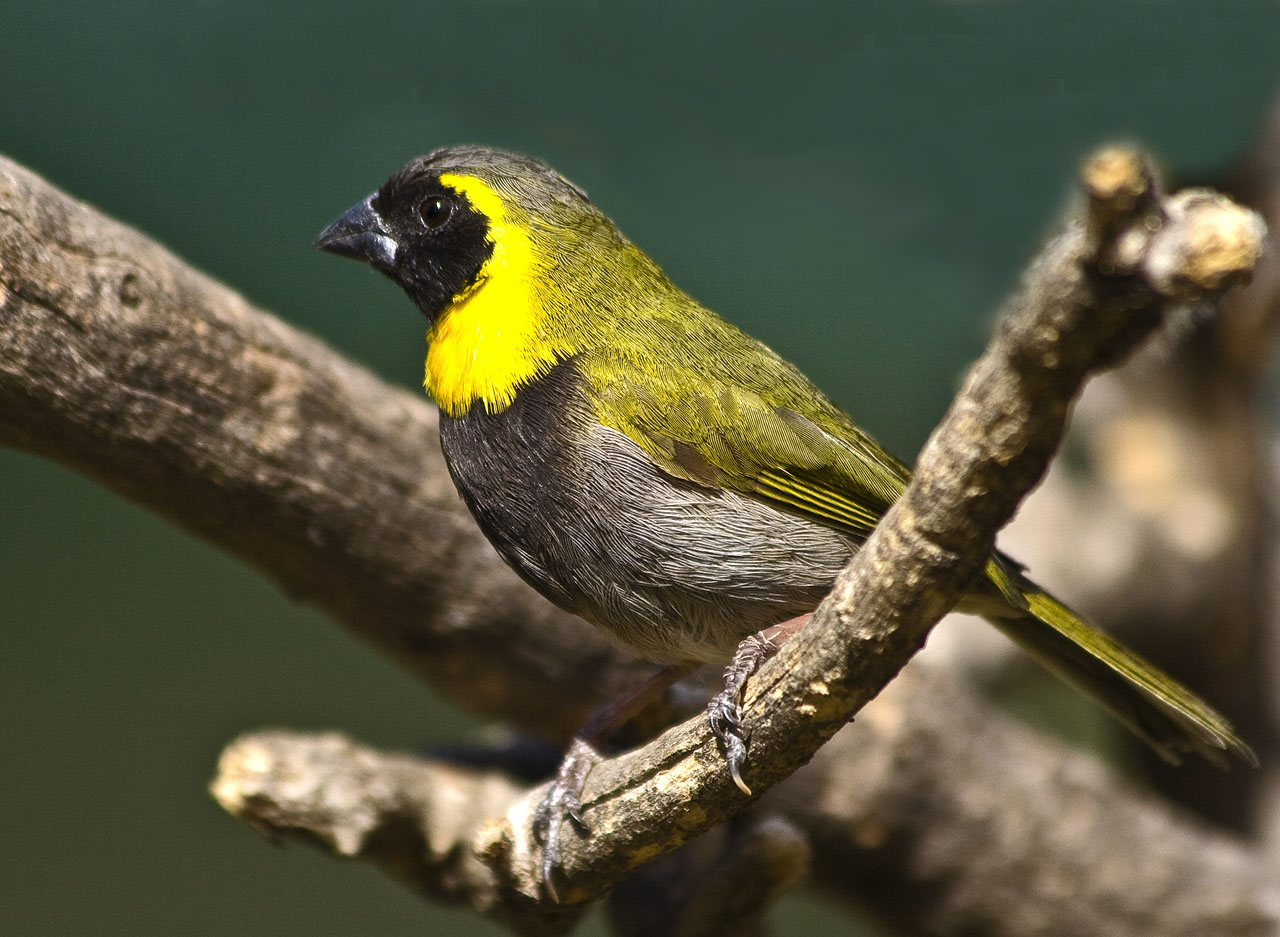
- Male at Canberra Walk In Aviary, Australia

Conservation status
- Least Concern (IUCN 3.1)

Scientific classification
- Kingdom: Animalia
- Phylum: Chordata
- Class: Aves
- Order: Passeriformes
- Family: Thraupidae
- Genus: Phonipara; Bonaparte, 1850
- Species: P. canora

Binomial name
- Phonipara canora (Gmelin, 1789)

Synonyms
- See text

= Cuban grassquit =

Species of bird

The Cuban grassquit (Phonipara canora) is a species of bird in the family Thraupidae, the tanagers and allies. It is endemic to Cuba. An introduced population is established on New Providence in the Bahamas.

== Taxonomy and systematics ==
The Cuban grassquit was formally described in 1789 by the German naturalist Johann Friedrich Gmelin under the binomial name Loxia canora. He based his description on the "Brown Cheeked Grosbeak" that had been described by Peter Brown in 1776. Brown's illustration was from a live bird belonging to Marmaduke Tunstall which Brown mistakenly believed had come from Mexico. It only occurs in Cuba. By 1970 the species had been placed in the genus Tiaris, but a molecular phylogenetic study published in 2014 found that Tiaris was polyphyletic. Between 2016 and 2020 taxonomic systems moved the Cuban grassquit to the resurrected genus Phonipara that had been introduced in 1850 by the French naturalist Charles Lucien Bonaparte. The genus name combines the Ancient Greek phōnēs meaning "vocal" with the Latin parus meaning "tit". The specific epithet conora is from Latin canorus meaning "melodious".

Although traditionally placed with the buntings and New World sparrows in the family Emberizidae, molecular genetic studies have shown that the Cuban grassquit is a member of the subfamily Coerebinae within the tanager family Thraupidae.

The Cuban grassquit is the only member of its genus and has no subspecies.

== Description ==
The Cuban grassquit averages 11 cm (4.3 in) long with an average weight of 8.2 g (0.29 oz). The species is sexually dimorphic. Adult males have a black forehead, a grayish crown, and a black face and throat. They have a bright yellow collar behind and under the black face, usually with a small black break under the middle of the throat. Their upperparts and tail are olive green and their wings olive green with yellowish edges on the primaries. Their breast is black and the rest of their underparts olive gray that becomes paler to the rear. Adult females have a similar pattern to males but are overall duller. Their face and throat are dark chestnut and their cheeks grayish. Their collar is thinner and a duller yellow than the male's. Their upperparts, wings, and tail are like the male's Their underparts are a paler gray than the male's. Both sexes have a dark brown iris, a black bill, and pinkish to dusky pinkish legs and feet.

== Distribution and habitat ==
The Cuban grassquit is found throughout Cuba and as an introduced species in the Bahamian island of New Providence. It inhabits a variety of open landscapes, mostly in semi-arid areas. These include shrubby grasslands and farmlands, scrublands, the edges of forest, pine forest, and shade coffee and citrus plantations. It primarily is in the lowlands but reaches mid-elevations to about 1,000 m (3,300 ft).

== Behavior ==
=== Movement ===
The Cuban grassquit is a sedentary year-round resident.

=== Feeding ===
The Cuban grassquit feeds primarily on seeds and fruits with smaller amounts of grass shoots and insects. It forages on and near the ground.

=== Breeding ===
The Cuban grassquit breeds between March and October. Its nest is a globe with a side entrance, made from dry grass and other plant fibers lined with soft material. It is typically placed not far above the ground in a spiny tree. The clutch is usually two or three eggs though four are known; the eggs are greenish white with brown to lilac markings. The incubation period is 11 to 13 days and fledging occurs 12 to 17 days after hatch. Both parents provision nestlings.

=== Vocalization ===
The Cuban grassquit's song is a "shrill, raspy chiri-wichiwichi, chibiri-wichi-wichi. It also makes a chip call.

== Status ==
The IUCN has assessed the Cuban grassquit as being of Least Concern. It has a large range; its population size is not known and is believed to be decreasing. No immediate threats have been identified. It is considered common in Cuba and fairly common on New Providence. "González et al. consider the main causes of the decline in Cuban Grassquit populations to be the illegal cagebird trade, habitat fragmentation and loss, tourism development, fires, and hurricanes."
