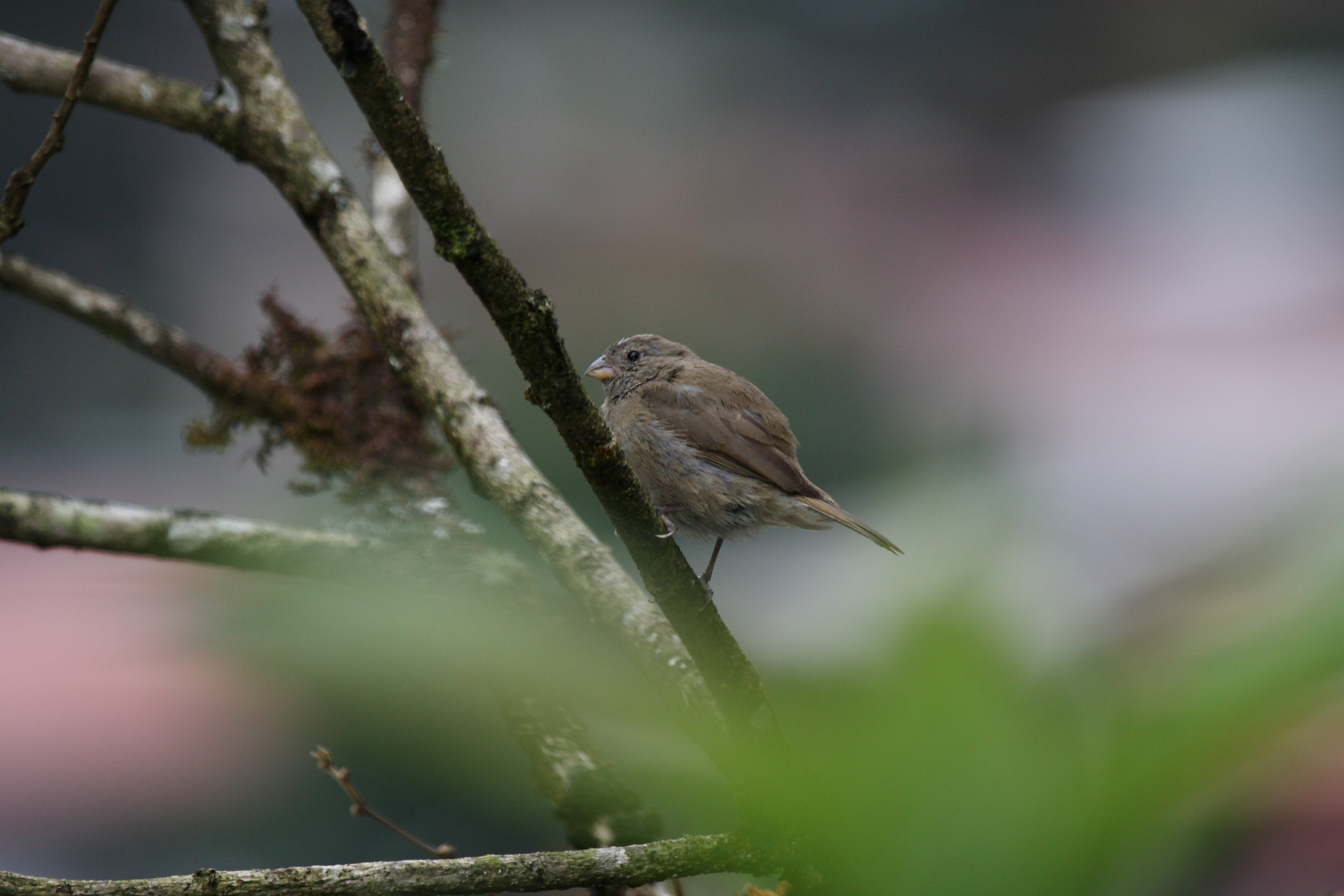

Conservation status
- Least Concern (IUCN 3.1)

Scientific classification
- Kingdom: Animalia
- Phylum: Chordata
- Class: Aves
- Order: Passeriformes
- Family: Thraupidae
- Genus: Asemospiza
- Species: A. obscura

Binomial name
- Asemospiza obscura (d'Orbigny & Lafresnaye, 1837)

Synonyms
- See text

= Dull-coloured grassquit =

Dull-colored grassquit

Species of bird

The dull-colored grassquit (Note: All major worldwide taxonomic systems spell the name "colored".) (Asemospiza obscura) is a small bird in the family Thraupidae, the tanagers and allies. It is found in Argentina, Bolivia, Brazil, Colombia, Ecuador, Paraguay, Peru and Venezuela.

== Taxonomy and systematics ==
The dull-colored grassquit was formally described in 1837 with the binomial Emberiza obscura. For much of the twentieth century it was placed in the genus Sporophila but by the early twenty-first it had been transferred to Tiaris. Finally, based on studies published in 2014 and 2015, in 2016 Burns et al. erected the genus Asemospiza with the sooty grassquit (A. fuliginosa) as the type species and including the dull-colored grassquit. The genus is closely related to Darwin's finches.

The dull-colored grassquit has these four subspecies:

- A. o. haplochroma (Todd, 1912)
- A. o. pauper (Berlepsch & Taczanowski, 1884)
- A. o. obscura (d'Orbigny & Lafresnaye, 1837)
- A. o. pacifica (Koepcke, 1963)

== Description ==
The dull-colored grassquit is 10.5 to 11.5 cm (4.1 to 4.5 in) long and weighs an average of 11.2 g (0.40 oz). The sexes have the same plumage. Adults of the nominate subspecies A. o. obscura have a brownish head and upperparts. They have thin, pale supercilium, a darker line through the eye, and pale crescents above and below the eye. Their throat, breast, and upper flanks are grayish brown and their belly paler. Its more northerly population has a darker breast than more southerly birds. They have a dark brown iris, a dark bill with a yellowish horn base to the mandible, and brownish legs.

Subspecies A. o. haplochroma is the darkest of the four. It is essentially all brownish with little contrast between the upper- and underparts. It alone has an entirely dark bill. The population of A. o. pauper in Colombia and Ecuador has a pale brown breast, buffy flanks, and a pale cream belly; its bill has a dark maxilla and a pale mandible. In the south its breast is grayish and both its flanks and belly pale cream. A. o. pacifica is large and pale and similarly colored to the southern A. O. pauper.

== Distribution and habitat ==
The subspecies of the dull-colored grassquit are found thus:

- A. o. haplochroma: northern Colombia's isolated Sierra Nevada de Santa Marta; Venezuelan Coastal Range from Carabobo to Miranda; northeastern Venezuela in southwestern Sucre and northern Monagas; Venezuelan Andes from western Mérida and Táchira south through most of the Colombian Andes
- A. o. pauper: from Nariño Department in far southwestern Colombia south on the western Andean slope through Ecuador (Note: The map in Ridgely and Greenfield's field guide does not include most of northwestern Ecuador's Esmeraldas Province in the species' range.) into Peru, where it is on the western slope south to northern Huánuco Department and on the eastern slope in San Martín and Loreto departments
- A. o. obscura: eastern Andean slope intermittently from San Martín south through Bolivia into northwestern Argentina to Tucumán Province and east across southern Bolivia into western Paraguay, Chaco Province in northern Argentina, and slightly into southwestern Brazil's Mato Grosso
- A. o. pacifica: Peruvian coastal plain and foothills from Ancash Department south to Arequipa Department

The dull-colored grassquit inhabits mostly open landscapes including forest and woodland edges and shrubby clearings, roadside thickets, dry scrublands, and gardens. In elevation in Venezuela it is found between 400 and 2,000 m (1,300 and 6,600 ft) but mostly above 700 m (2,300 ft). It is found below 1,700 m (5,600 ft) in Colombia, mostly below 1,400 m (4,600 ft) in Ecuador, and between 350 and 2,100 m (1,100 and 6,900 ft) in Peru.

== Behavior ==
=== Movement ===
The dull-colored grassquit is a year-round resident in most of its range. It is probably non-breeding in far eastern Bolivia, Paraguay, and Argentina's Chaco. According to the South American Classification Committee it is solely a non-breeding visitor to Brazil. (Note: VanPerlo's field guide shows it as a year-round resident.) It is thought to wander seasonally in Venezuela but details are not known.

=== Feeding ===
The dull-colored grassquit feeds on seeds, especially those of Panicum grasses. It feeds on the ground or by landing on grass to bend the seedhead down, and often within some cover. It usually forages singly or in pairs and sometimes in small flocks.

=== Breeding ===
The dull-colored grassquit breeds during the first half of the year in Ecuador. Its season includes January and February in Bolivia and Argentina and its seasons elsewhere are not known. Its nest is a dome with a side entrance, made from plant fibers, and usually with a "roof" over the entrance. It is typically in a branch fork of a small tree or bush within about 3 m (10 ft) of the ground. The clutch is three or four eggs that are whitish with pale and dark brown speckles. The incubation period, time to fledging, and details of parental care are not known.

=== Vocalization ===
The dull-colored grassquit's song is "explosive and buzzy, e.g. zeetig, zeezeezig with many variants". Its call is "a high-pitched ti".

== Status ==
The IUCN has assessed the dull-colored grassquit as being of Least Concern. It has a very large range; its population size is not known but is believed to be increasing. No immediate threats have been identified. It is considered "[v]ery spotty and unpredictable in occurrence" in Venezuela and "uncommon" along the Peruvian coast and western slope and "rare but widespread" on the eastern. In Colombia it is "fairly common but often very hard to identify with certainty". (Many records attributed to the sooty grassquit are probably of the dull-colored.)
