= Boa Esperança, Paraná =

Boa Esperança
- Municipality
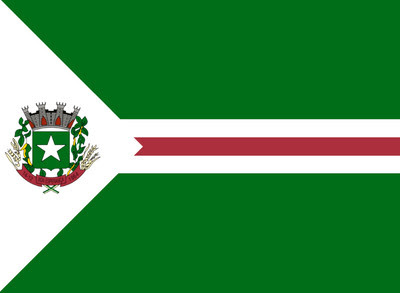
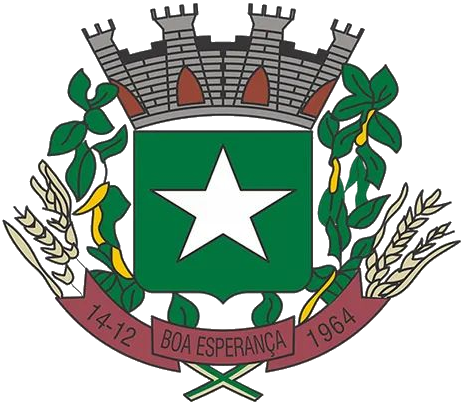
- Flag Coat of arms

- Location in Brazil
- Coordinates: 24°14′31″S 52°47′20″W
- Country: Brazil
- Region: Southern
- State: Paraná
- Mesoregion: Centro-Ocidental Paranaense

Population (2020)
  - Total: 4,047
- Time zone: UTC−3 (BRT)

Boa Esperança is a municipality in the state of Paraná in the Southern Region of Brazil.

== See also ==
- List of municipalities in Paraná
