= Seedeater =

Group of birds

The seedeaters are a form taxon of seed-eating passerine birds with a distinctively conical bill.

Most are Central and South American birds that were formerly placed in the American sparrow family (Passerellidae), but are now known to be tanagers (Thraupidae) closely related to Darwin's finches. Indeed, some of the birds listed here as seedeaters are closer to these "finches", while the more "true" seedeaters form a clade with some tanagers. A few "atypical" seedeaters are closely related to certain tanagers, many of which (such as the flowerpiercers) have peculiarly adapted bills.

In addition, there are some African passerines called seedeaters. They belong to the serin genus (Serinus) of the true finch family (Fringillidae), but might need to be separated with their closest relatives in Crithagra.

== American seedeaters ==
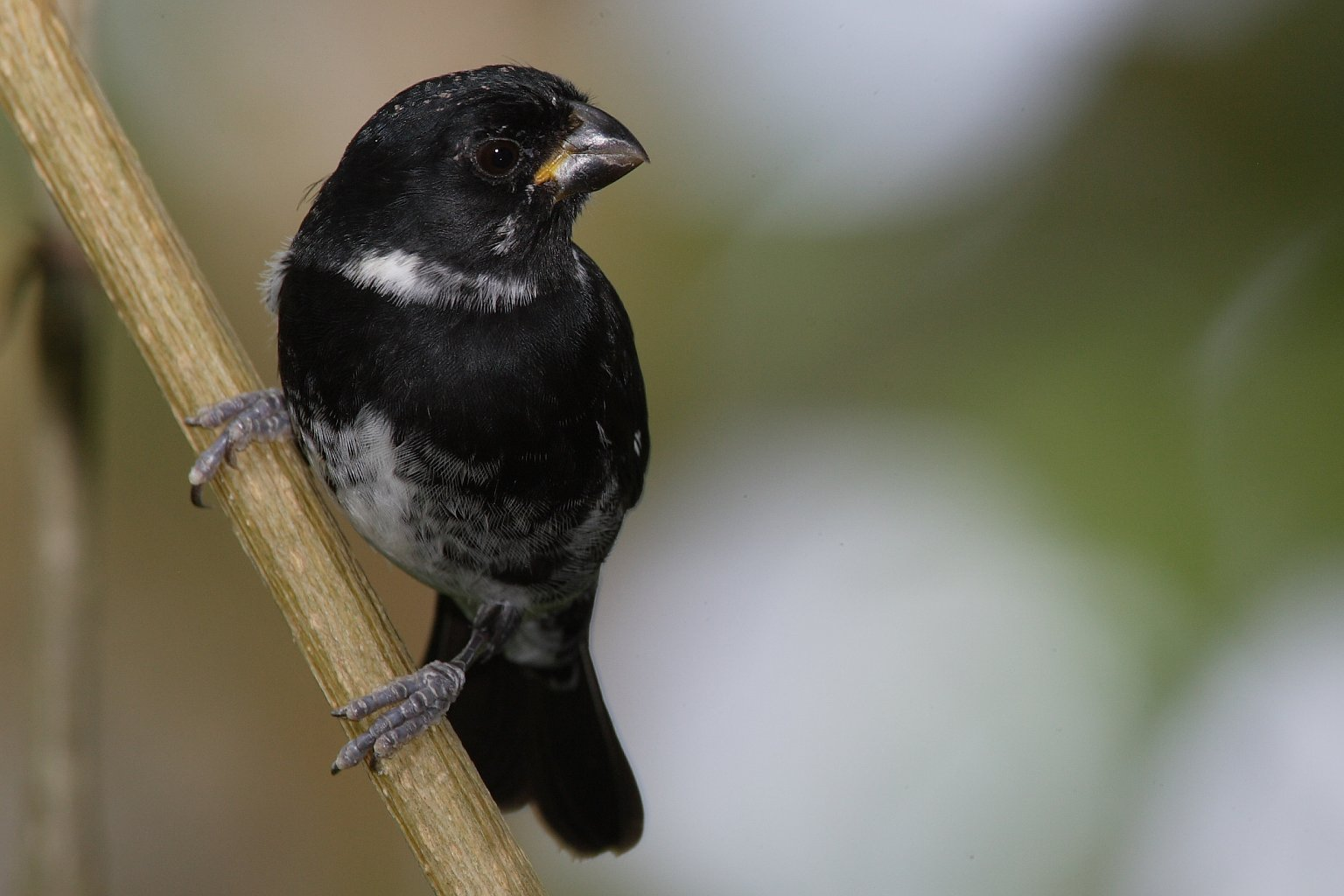
Male variable seedeater (Sporophila corvina), a true seedeater from the tropical Americas

True seedeaters

- Amaurospiza – blue seedeaters (4 species, tentatively placed here)
- Dolospingus – white-naped seedeater
- Oryzoborus – seed-finches (6 species, sometimes included in Sporophila)
- Sporophila – typical seedeaters (some 30 species, 1 possibly recently extinct)

Related to Darwin's finches

- Euneornis – orangequit
- Loxigilla – Antillean bullfinches (4 species)
- Loxipasser – yellow-shouldered grassquit
- Melanospiza – St. Lucia black finch
- Melopyrrha – Cuban bullfinch
- Tiaris – typical grassquits (5 species)

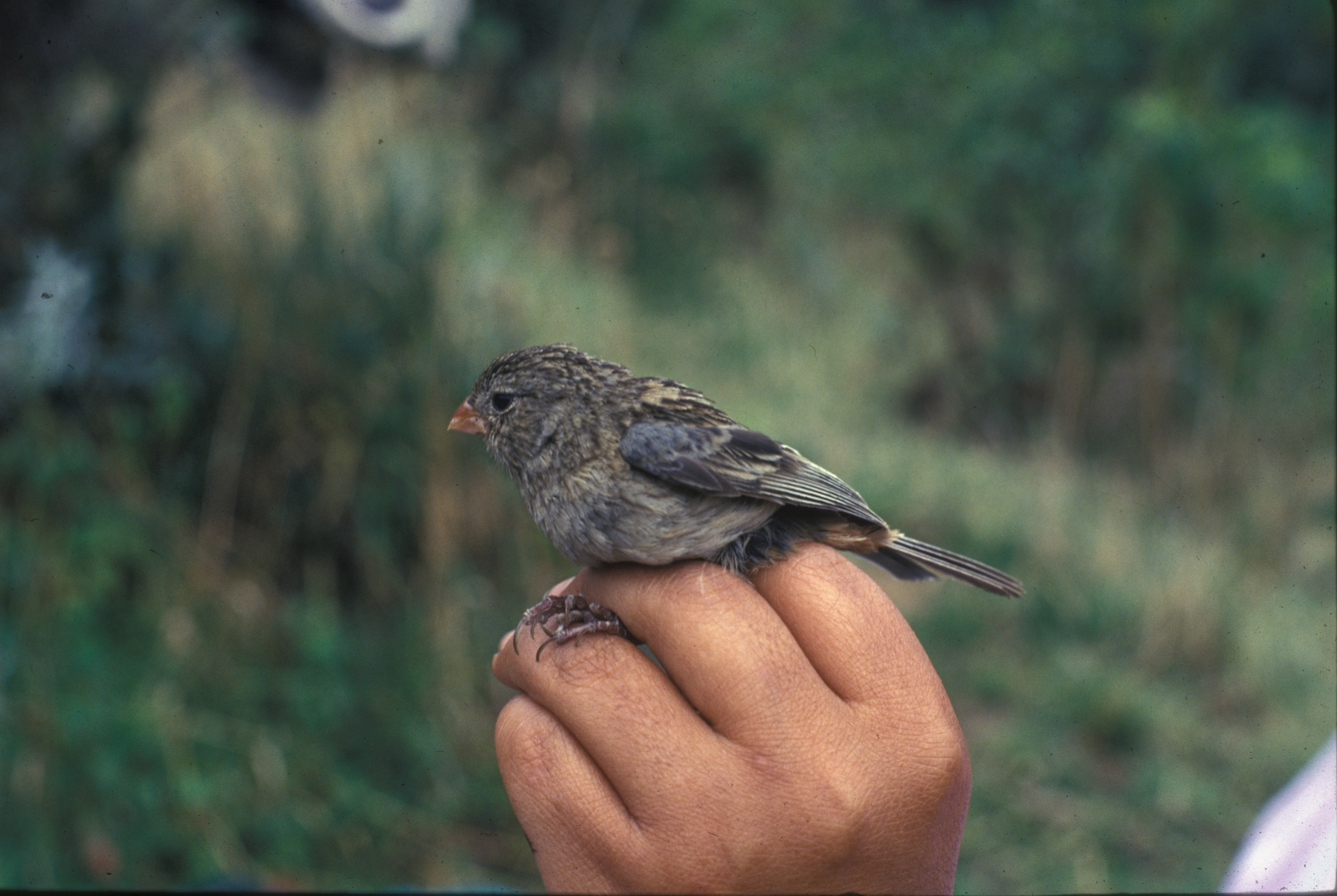
The plain-colored seedeater (Catamenia inornata) is more closely related to other tanagers than to the true seedeaters

Atypical seedeaters

- Acanthidops – peg-billed finch
- Catamenia (3 species)
- Haplospiza (2 species)

Relatives of true seedeaters

These tanagers are the true seedeaters' closest relatives:

- Charitospiza – coal-crested finch
- Lophospingus (2 species)
- Sicalis – yellow-finches (12 species)
- Volatinia – blue-black grassquit

== African seedeaters ==
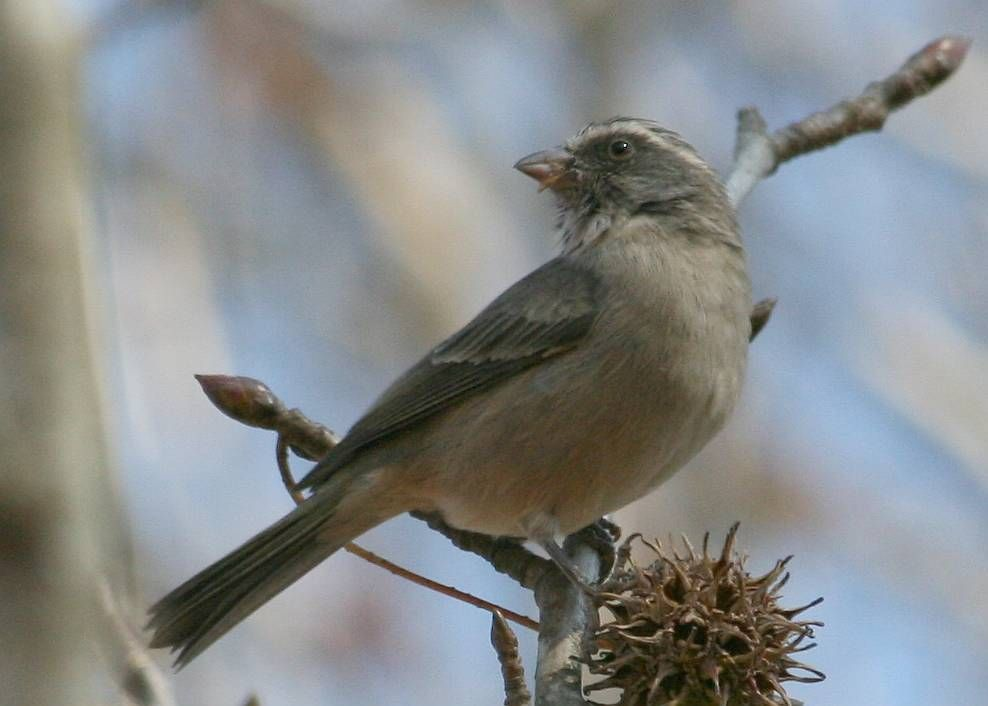
Streaky-headed seedeater (Serinus gularis), an African seedeater

- Southern yellow-rumped seedeater, Serinus atrogularis
- Thick-billed seedeater, Serinus burtoni
- Lemon-breasted seedeater, Serinus citrinipectus
- Yellow-throated seedeater, Serinus flavigula
- Streaky-headed seedeater, Serinus gularis
- Protea seedeater, Serinus leucopterus
- White-rumped seedeater, Serinus leucopygius
- Black-eared seedeater, Serinus mennelli
- Reichard's seedeater, Serinus reichardi
- Principe seedeater, Serinus rufobrunneus
- Streaky seedeater, Serinus striolatus
- Brown-rumped seedeater, Serinus tristriatus
- Abyssinian yellow-rumped seedeater, Serinus xanthopygius
