= Catamenia =

Catamenia may refer to:

- Catamenia (band), the Finnish melodic black metal band
- Catamenia, the female menstrual cycle, female period
- Catamenia (bird), a genus of birds in the family Thraupidae
