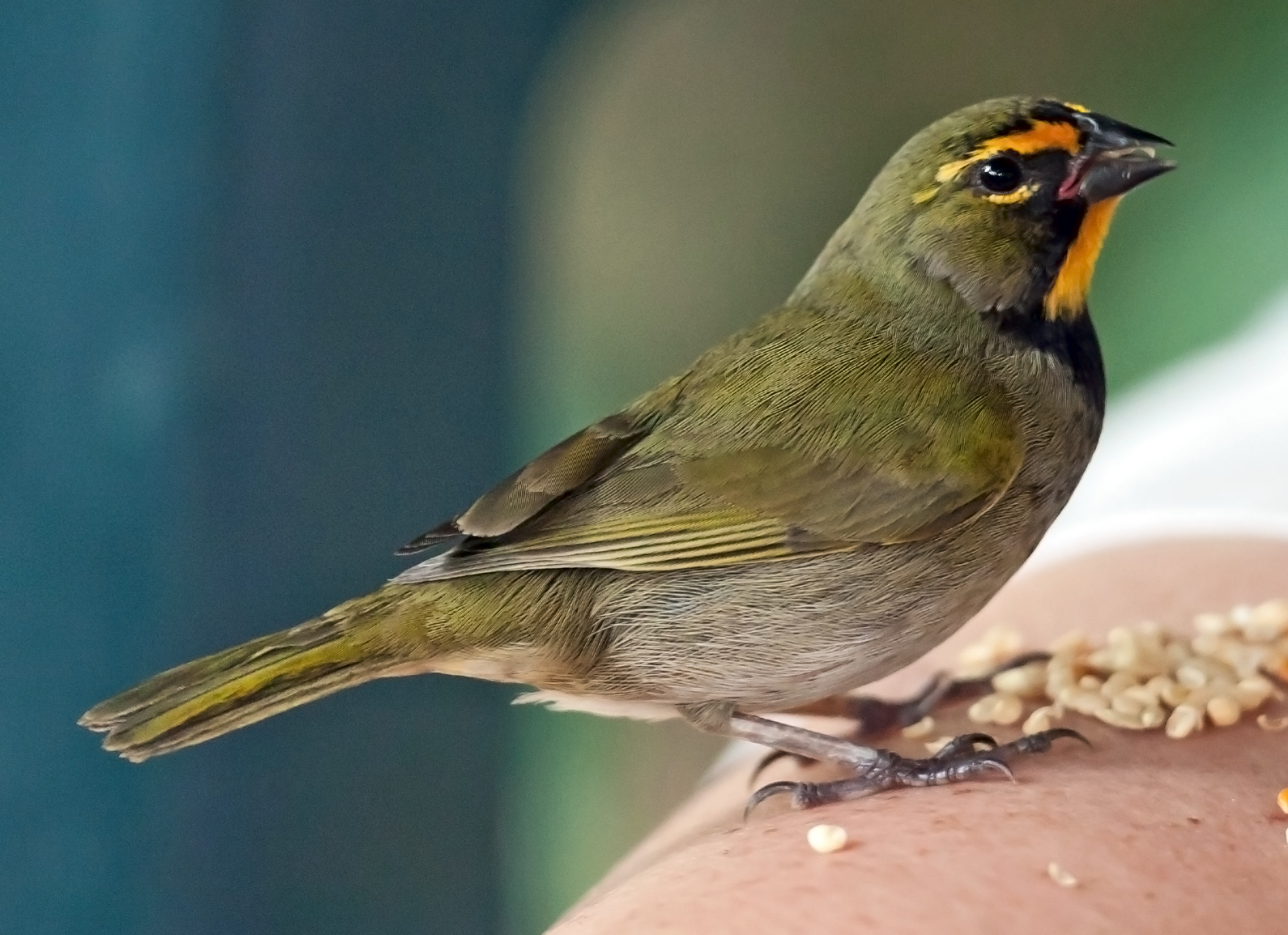
- Male in Jamaica
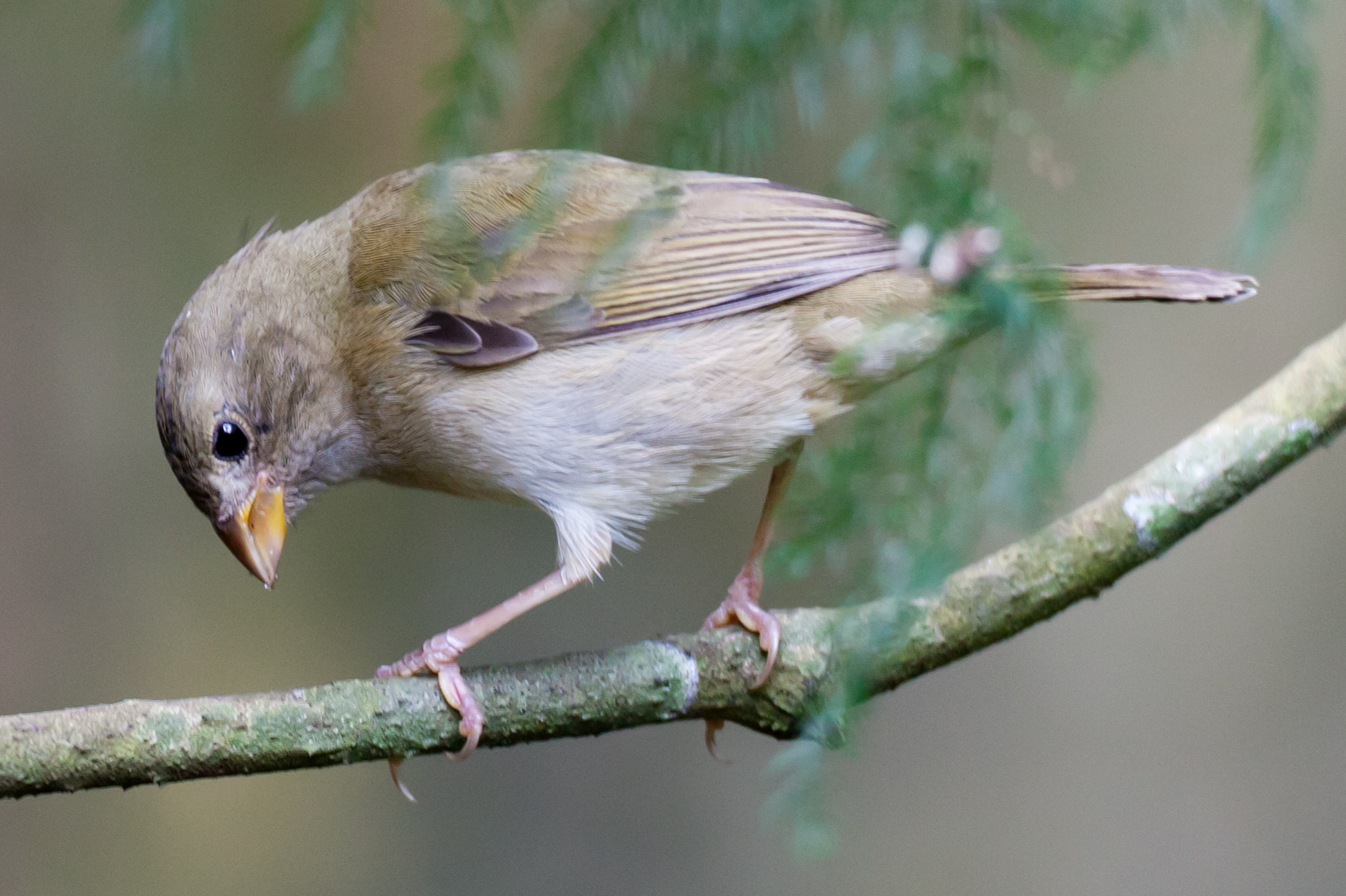
- Female in Jamaica

Conservation status
- Least Concern (IUCN 3.1)

Scientific classification
- Kingdom: Animalia
- Phylum: Chordata
- Class: Aves
- Order: Passeriformes
- Family: Thraupidae
- Genus: Tiaris; Swainson, 1827
- Species: T. olivaceus

Binomial name
- Tiaris olivaceus (Linnaeus, 1766)

Synonyms
- Emberiza olivacea Linnaeus, 1766; Tiaris olivacea (lapsus)

= Yellow-faced grassquit =

Species of bird

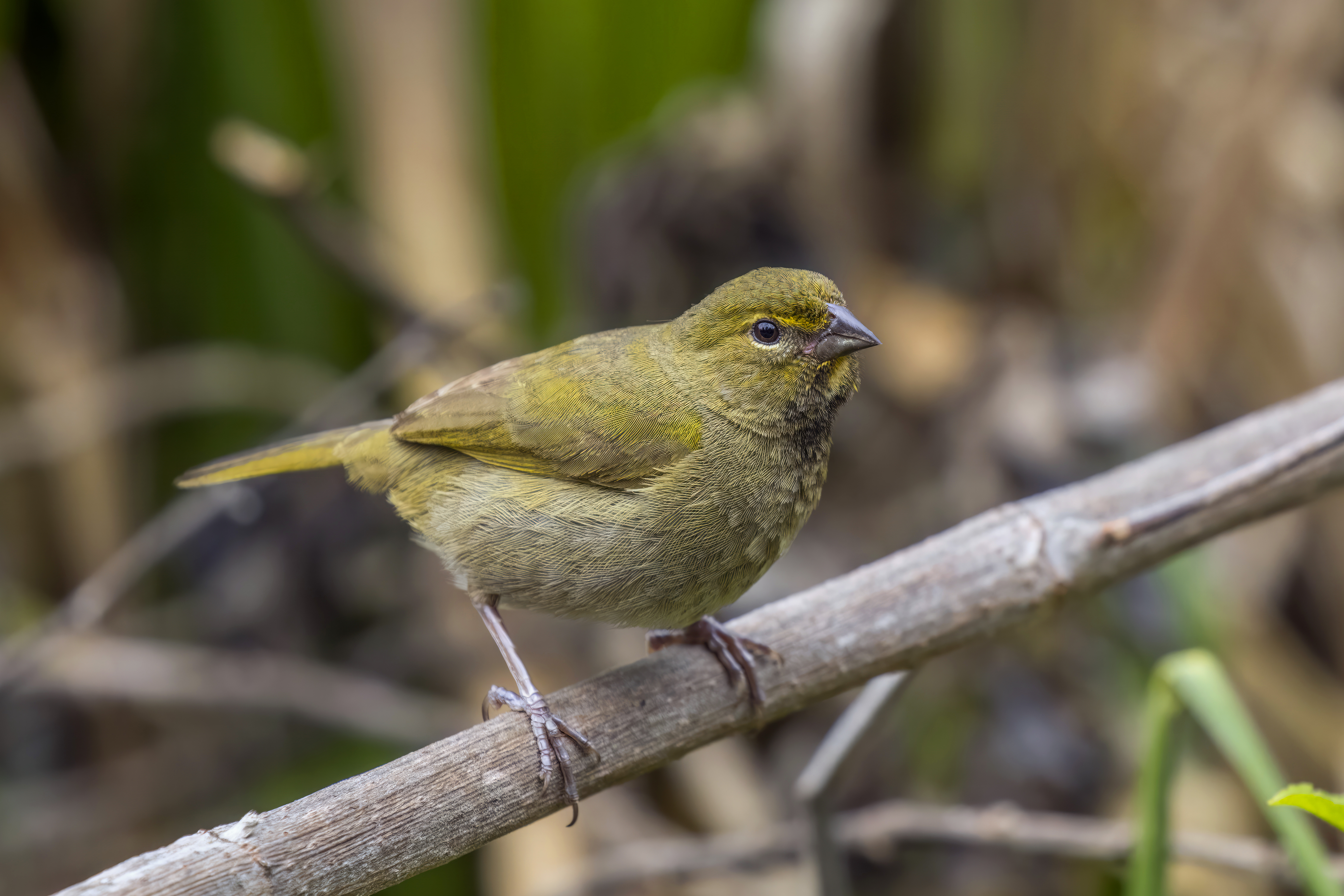
Immature male, Panama

The yellow-faced grassquit (Tiaris olivaceus) is a passerine bird in the tanager family Thraupidae and is the only member of the genus Tiaris. It is native to Central America, South America, and the Caribbean.

== Taxonomy ==
In 1760 the French zoologist Mathurin Jacques Brisson included a description of the yellow-faced grassquit in his Ornithologie based on a specimen collected in Saint-Domingue (now Haiti). He used the French name Le bruant de S. Domingue and the Latin name Emberiza dominicensis. Although Brisson coined Latin names, these do not conform to the binomial system and are not recognised by the International Commission on Zoological Nomenclature. When in 1766 the Swedish naturalist Carl Linnaeus updated his Systema Naturae for the twelfth edition he added 240 species that had been previously described by Brisson. One of these was the yellow-faced grassquit. Linnaeus included a terse description, coined the binomial name Emberiza olivacea and cited Brisson's work. The specific name olivaceus is Neo-Latin for "olive-green". This is now the only species placed in the genus Tiaris that was introduced by the English naturalist William Swainson in 1827. The genus formerly contained additional species. A molecular phylogenetic study published in 2014 found that the genus was non-monophyletic and in the subsequent rearrangement four species were moved to other genera.

The yellow-faced grassquit was traditionally placed with the buntings and New World sparrows in the family Emberizidae, but molecular phylogenetic studies have shown that it is a member of the tanager family Thraupidae and belongs to the subfamily Coerebinae that also contains Darwin's finches.

Five subspecies are recognised:

- T. o. pusillus Swainson, 1827 – east Mexico to Ecuador and Venezuela
- T. o. intermedius (Ridgway, 1885) – island of Cozumel (off southeast Mexico)
- T. o. ravidus Wetmore, 1957 – Coiba Island (off south Panama)
- T. o. olivaceus (Linnaeus, 1766) – nominate subspecies; Cuba (including Isla de la Juventud), the Cayman Islands, Jamaica and Hispaniola (the Dominican Republic and Haiti)
- T. o. bryanti (Ridgway, 1898) – Puerto Rico and nearby islands

== Description ==
It is a small bird with a conical bill, sharper than that of the related seedeaters. It is 10–10.7 cm (3.9–4.2 in) long and weighs about 8–10 g (0.28–0.35 oz), depending on subspecies. The adult male has an olive-green back, and its face and breast are black apart from a bright yellow throat, supercilia, and lower eyelid spot. The rest of the underparts are greyish olive. The beak and eyes are dark, while the legs are grey.

The adult female is slightly smaller on average than the male. It is dull olive-green above and paler grey below, and may have some dark breast smudges. The yellow face pattern is much weaker and duller, and may be almost invisible. The lower part of the beak is dark horn-colored (light grey). Young birds are coloured essentially like the adult female, but duller and greyer. Young males begin to acquire full adult plumage in their first year.

=== Call ===
The yellow-faced grassquit has a weak buzzing trilled ttttt-tee call. The song is a varying series of high thin rapid trills. Given for a prolonged time, it is melodious, yet subdued, and often only heard from a short distance away.

== Distribution and habitat ==
It breeds from central Mexico to northern Ecuador and north-western Venezuela, and also on the Greater Antilles and nearby islands. It is not a migratory bird but moves about outside the breeding season; vagrants have been recorded in southern Texas and Florida. It has been introduced to Hawaii.

The yellow-faced grassquit is a common to abundant resident in lowlands and foothills up to 2,300 m (7,500 ft) altitude in semi-open areas such as roadsides, pasture, weedy fields and low scrub. It avoids dry grassland and other very low growth, but will readily utilize neglected gardens where lawn grass has grown high. It is a fairly sociable bird, sometimes forming loose flocks with other tanagers (such as seedeaters) and emberizids that share its lifestyle. Occasionally, adult males will come together to perch in a shrub and sing.

== Diet ==
This species feeds mainly on grass seeds, but also takes other seeds, berries and some insects. Food is typically plucked from the inflorescences directly, or gathered from the ground. Animal prey is hunted among foliage in a New World warbler-like fashion.

== Breeding ==
The main breeding season is in the summer months, but except for February to April birds may nest at other times of the year. This species sometimes forms loose nesting colonies. During courtship, the male vibrates his wings as he sings his subdued song, sitting only 1–2 in (2.5–5.1 cm) away so the female can properly hear him. The roughly globular nest, built by the female, is made of grass and weed stems compacted into a thick mass, and lined with pieces of grass inflorescences and bast fibre. It has a side entrance and is placed usually less than 30 cm (12 in) above the ground, often among grass or weeds on a road or river embankment. Occasionally, the species nests in shrubs up to 1.5 m (4.9 ft) above the ground. The clutch is two or three, rarely four, brown-speckled white eggs. They are incubated by the female alone for 12–14 days to hatching.

== Conservation ==
This bird is not rare and widely distributed; it is thus classified a species of Least Concern by the IUCN. It seems to benefit from deforestation, increasing in numbers and expanding its range; for example, it is only since 1997 known from the eastern Andean slope of Meta Department in Colombia.
