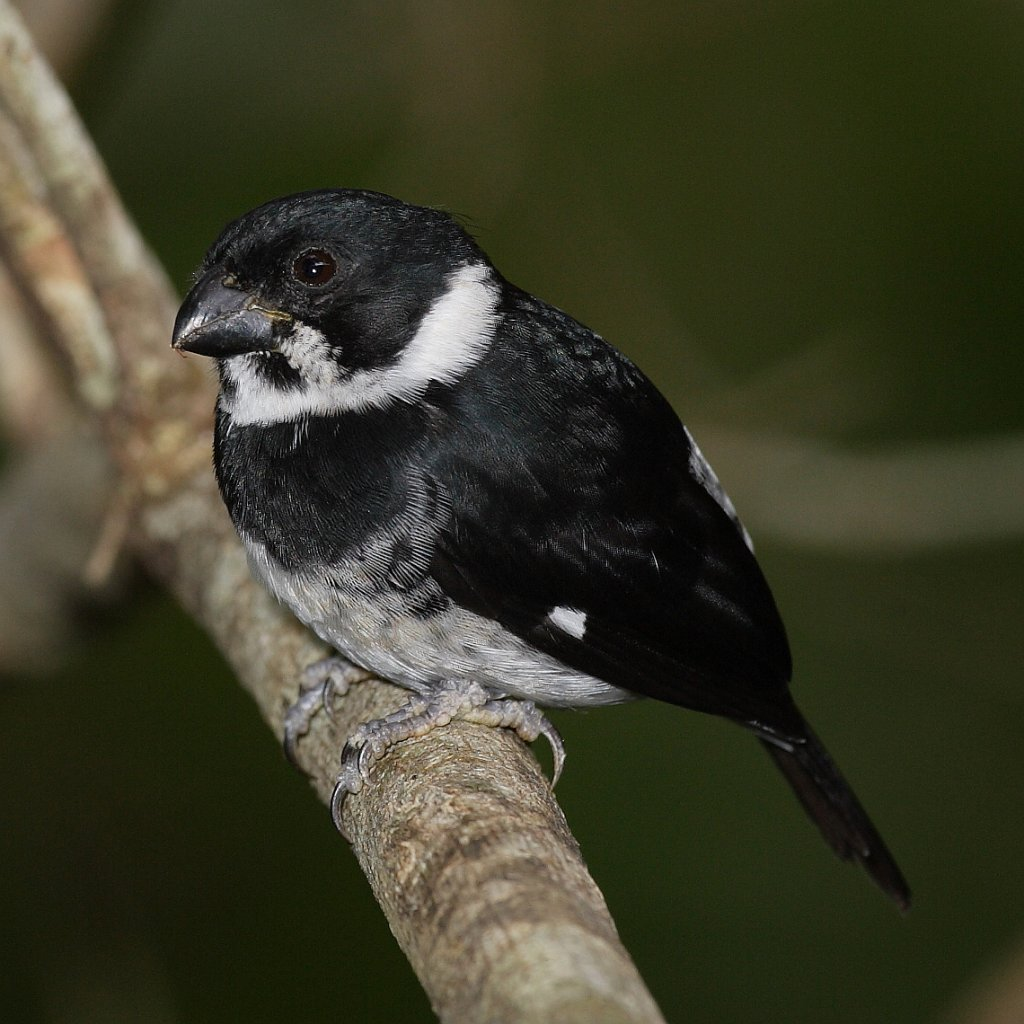
- A male near Panama City, Panama.

Conservation status
- Least Concern (IUCN 3.1)

Scientific classification
- Kingdom: Animalia
- Phylum: Chordata
- Class: Aves
- Order: Passeriformes
- Family: Thraupidae
- Genus: Sporophila
- Species: S. corvina

Binomial name
- Sporophila corvina (Sclater, PL, 1860)

Synonyms
- Sporophila aurita Sporophila americana aurita Sporophila americana corvina

= Variable seedeater =

Species of bird

The variable seedeater (Sporophila corvina) is a passerine bird which breeds from southern Mexico through Central America to the Chocó of northwestern South America. The taxonomy is confusing, and it was formerly considered a subspecies of Sporophila americana (see Taxonomy). Even within the variable seedeater as presently defined, there are great variations in plumage.

== Description ==
The variable seedeater is a small, robust bird with a black conical bill. It is 10.5 cm (4.1 in) long and weighs 11 g (0.39 oz). There are four subspecies, which differ primarily in the plumage of the male:

- S. c. corvina – (P.L. Sclater, 1860): (nominate), found from southern Mexico and along the Caribbean slope from Belize south to Panama. Adult males are entirely black apart from a small white wing-speculum and white wing linings.
- S. c. hoffmannii – Cabanis, 1861: found on the Pacific slope of Costa Rica and Panama. Males resemble males S. c. corvina, but with white half-collar, rump and belly (the rump often intermixed with grey and the flanks retain some black mottling or barring).
- S. c. hicksii – (Lawrence, 1865): found in eastern Panama and adjacent north-western Colombia. Males resemble S. c. hoffmannii, but, except for a small black chin and/or malar, the entire throat is white.
- S. c. ophthalmica – (P.L. Sclater, 1860): found in southwestern Colombia, western Ecuador, and far north-western Peru. Males are very similar to males of S. c. hicksii, but black malar is very fine or lacking, rump purer white, and shows purer white flanks with little or no black mottling/barring.

Previously, additional subspecies have been recognized for the various hybrid populations found where the above-mentioned subspecies meet (see Taxonomy).

Females are olive-brown above, paler below, and have white wing linings like the male. The racial differences in the female plumages are minor, with S. c. hoffmannii, S. c. hicksii and S. c. ophthalmica generally being paler and less brown than S. c. corvina, and often with a faint yellow tinge below. Juveniles are like the adult female of their subspecies. Males may not acquire the full adult plumage in their first year, and may breed whilst still showing some immature features in their appearance.

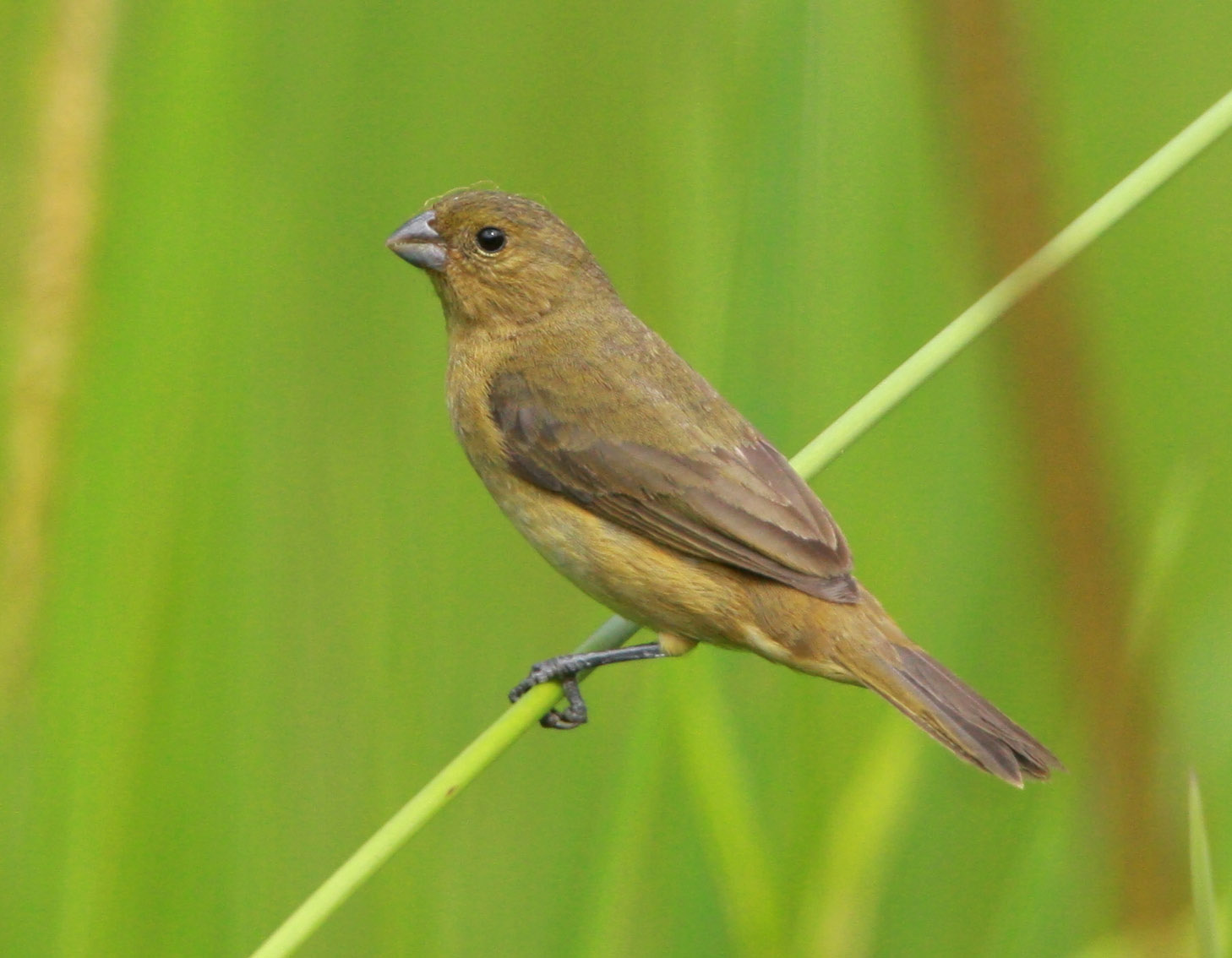
Female, Pajaro Jumbo Reserve near Mindo, Ecuador

A hypermelanic male was reported from Reserva Buenaventura in El Oro Province, Ecuador, in 2005. The bird had increased phaeomelanin; its white areas — except those of the wings — were bright tawny chestnut. A similar bird was collected along the "Pipeline Road" near Gamboa, Panama, in 1963. Such individuals seem to provide a glimpse at the circumstances of speciation: in the genera Sporophila and Oryzoborus, several species exist which differ externally only by one having white areas, the other being hypermelanic just as the two variable seedeaters mentioned here. Of course, there must be some factor maintaining reproductive isolation, but the plumage differences between such seedeater species pairs probably had their origin in such a mutation becoming fixed in a founder population due to genetic drift.

== Taxonomy ==
The taxonomy is highly confusing. Sporophila corvina was formerly considered a subspecies of Sporophila americana from northeastern South America, in which case the combined species (also incl. S. murallae from western Amazonia) had the common name variable seedeater. They were split based mainly on the work by Stiles (1996), but the taxa east (americana group and murallae) and west (corvina group) of the Andes had actually been considered separate species until they were merged into a single species by Meyer de Schauensee in 1952.

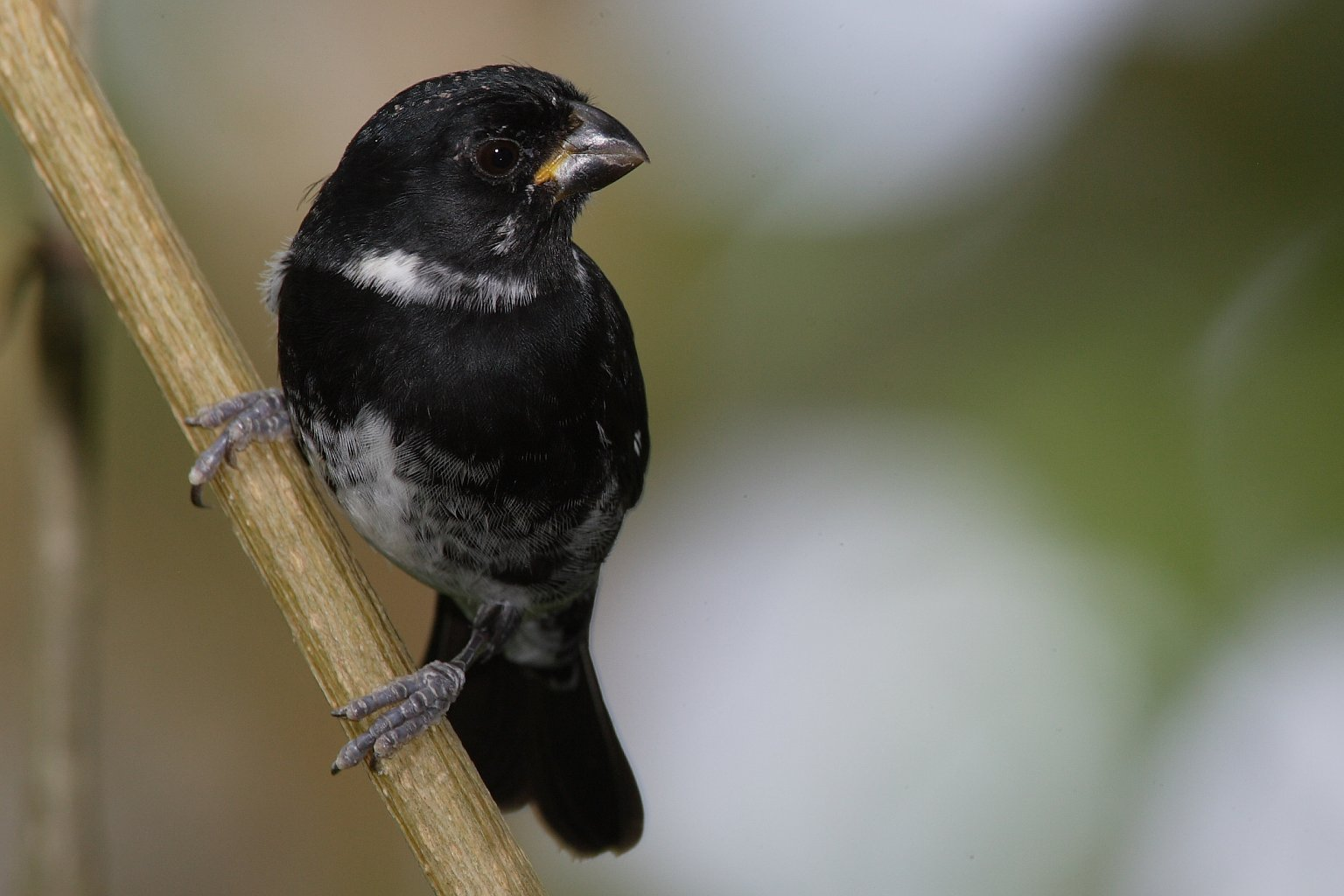
A male photographed near Panama City, Panama.

Following the split, additional confusion existed over the correct scientific name for present species. The name Sporophila aurita (Bonaparte, 1850) predates S. corvina by 10 years, and was widely believed to be the correct scientific name. However, the type for S. aurita has since disappeared and the original description was very vague, making it impossible to judge which population the name refers to. The name therefore becomes invalid, instead leading to S. corvina being the correct name.

Even after the split, the males of the remaining taxa have very different plumages, and the common name "variable seedeater" is fully deserved. The mainly black S. c. corvina has been considered a separate species, the black seedeater, from the remaining pied subspecies. As all subspecies hybridize freely wherever they meet, this is generally not recognized anymore. In large parts of Costa Rica and Panama it is impossible to clearly assign individuals to specific subspecies, where most instead show some level of intergradation between S. c. corvina, S. c. hoffmannii and/or S. c. hicksii. Some of these hybrid populations have in the past been recognized as separate subspecies, e.g. semicollaris, fortipes and collaris from Panama alone.

== Ecology ==
This seedeater is a common to abundant bird in lowlands and foothills up to 1,500 m (4,900 ft) altitude in semi-open areas such as forest edges, roadsides, low scrub and gardens. It also flocks with other species of seedeaters in pasture, weedy fields and other grassland.

This species feeds mainly on grass seeds but also takes other seeds, berries and some insects.

The flimsy cup nest, built by the female, is made of coarse plant material and lined with a few finer fibres. It is placed in a tree 0.4 to 6 m (1.3 to 19.7 ft) up, occasionally higher, in the fork of a twig. The clutch is two or three brown-speckled pale grey eggs, which are incubated by the female alone for 12–14 days to hatching.

The variable seedeater has a harsh chur call. The male's song consists of a mixture of warbles, whistles, and twitters, and is more elaborate on the Pacific slope.
