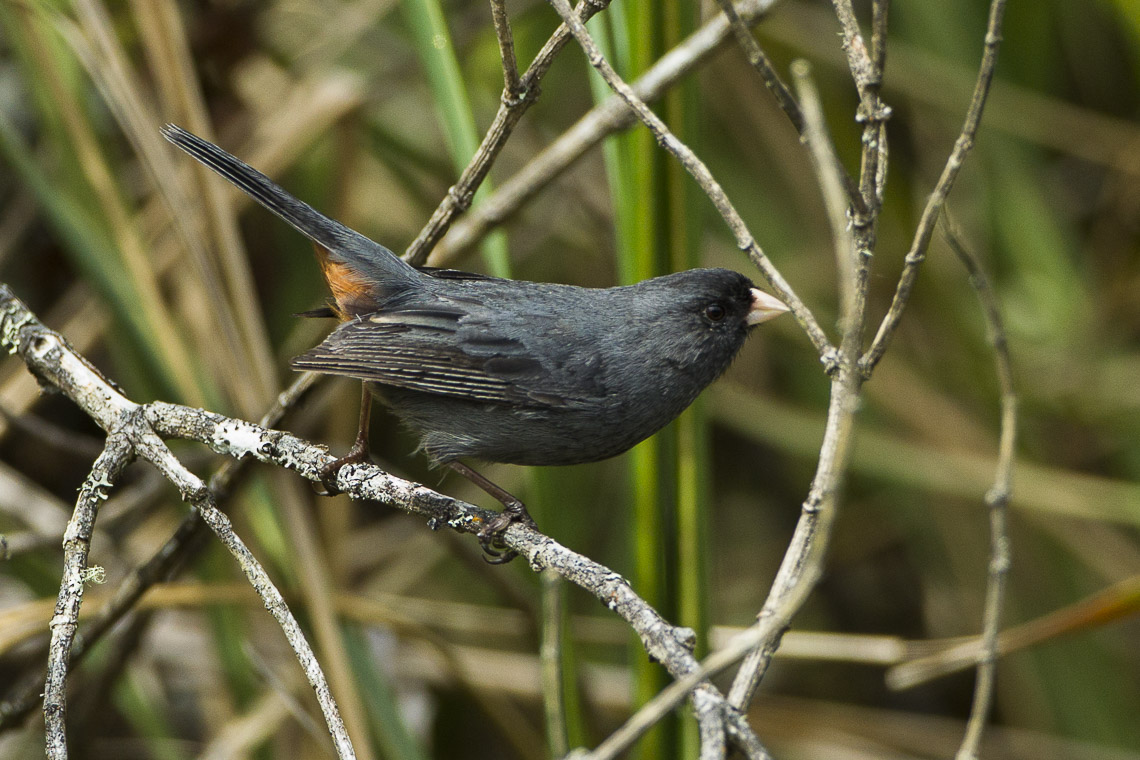

Conservation status
- Least Concern (IUCN 3.1)

Scientific classification
- Kingdom: Animalia
- Phylum: Chordata
- Class: Aves
- Order: Passeriformes
- Family: Thraupidae
- Genus: Catamenia
- Species: C. homochroa

Binomial name
- Catamenia homochroa Sclater, PL, 1859

Synonyms
- Catamenia oreophila

Audio

= Paramo seedeater =

Species of bird

The paramo seedeater (Catamenia homochroa) is a species of bird in the family Thraupidae.

== Distribution and habitat ==
It is found in Bolivia, Brazil, Colombia, Ecuador, Peru, and Venezuela. Its natural habitats are subtropical or tropical moist montane forests, subtropical or tropical high-altitude shrubland, and heavily degraded former forest.
