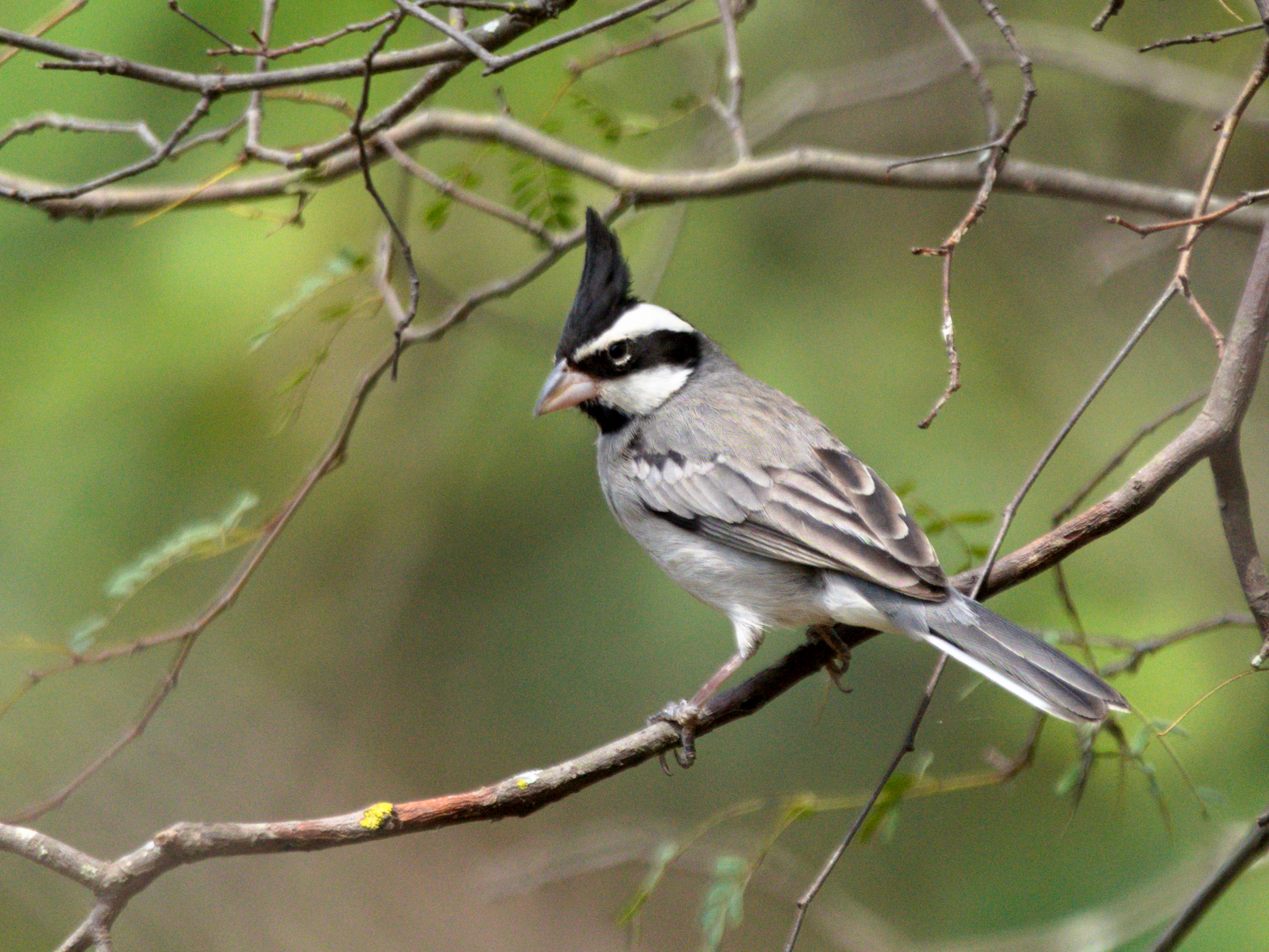

Conservation status
- Least Concern (IUCN 3.1)

Scientific classification
- Kingdom: Animalia
- Phylum: Chordata
- Class: Aves
- Order: Passeriformes
- Family: Thraupidae
- Genus: Lophospingus
- Species: L. pusillus

Binomial name
- Lophospingus pusillus (Burmeister, 1860)

= Black-crested finch =

Species of bird

The black-crested finch (Lophospingus pusillus) is a species of bird in the tanager family Thraupidae. It is found in Bolivia, Paraguay and northern Argentina. Its natural habitats are subtropical or tropical dry shrubland and subtropical or tropical high-altitude shrubland. It is a fairly common bird with a very wide range, and the International Union for Conservation of Nature has rated it to be a "least-concern species".

== Description ==
The adult black-crested finch is about 14 cm (5.5 in) in length. It has a yellowish-pink beak and a distinctive spiky black crest. The male has a black head and black throat, and a broad white superciliary stripe. The cheek area is also white. The upper parts of the body, the wings and tail are grey, apart from the white tips to the wing-coverts and the large white areas at the corners of the tail which are particularly obvious in flight. The underparts are largely pale grey. The female is a little more drab, the crest is retained but the head pattern is less distinct, and the back and wings are tinged with brown.

== Distribution and habitat ==
The black-crested finch is found in a large swathe of land in South America. Its range extends from southern Bolivia, through western Paraguay to northern Argentina. It is usually found in open woodland and chaco scrubland, at altitudes of up to 1,000 m (3,300 ft). It has been introduced into Uruguay.

== Ecology ==
The black-crested finch is generally seen in pairs or in small groups. It forages on the ground and in the undergrowth for seeds and small invertebrates. The nest is built by the male and is cup shaped. It is composed of lichens and vegetable fibres, bound together with spiders' webs and lined with animal hairs and fine rootlets.
