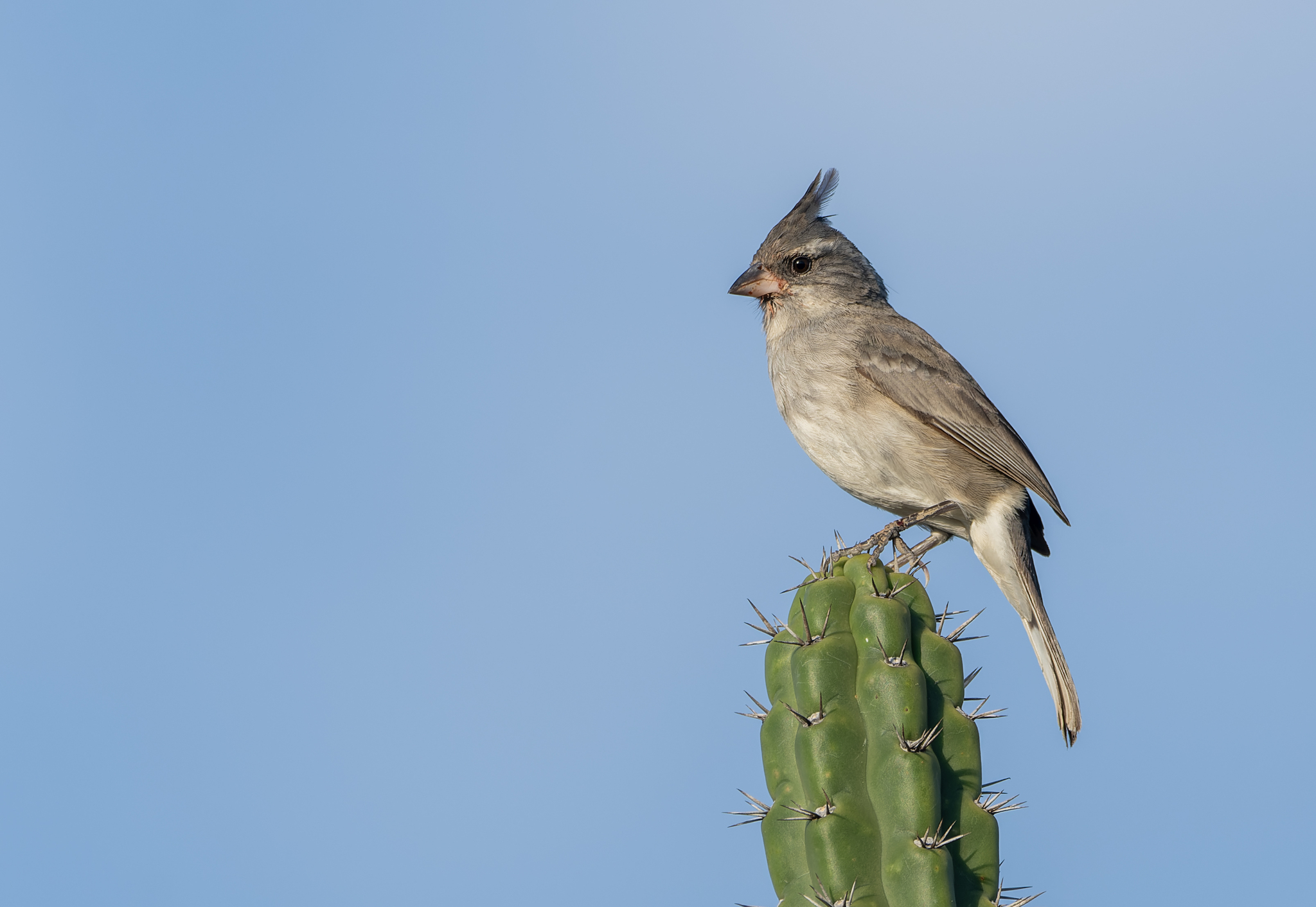

Conservation status
- Least Concern (IUCN 3.1)

Scientific classification
- Kingdom: Animalia
- Phylum: Chordata
- Class: Aves
- Order: Passeriformes
- Family: Thraupidae
- Genus: Lophospingus
- Species: L. griseocristatus

Binomial name
- Lophospingus griseocristatus (Lafresnaye & D'Orbigny, 1837)

= Grey-crested finch =

Species of bird

The grey-crested finch (Lophospingus griseocristatus) is a species of bird in the tanager family Thraupidae. It is found in Bolivia and northwestern Argentina where its natural habitats are subtropical or tropical high-altitude shrubland and heavily degraded former forest. The bird was first described in 1837 by the French ornithologist Frédéric de Lafresnaye and the French zoologist Alcide d'Orbigny after the latter had collected it on an expedition he undertook for the Paris Museum to South America between 1826 and 1833.

== Description ==
The grey-crested finch has a distinctive erect, spiky grey crest. Other parts of the bird are grey also, with the underparts being paler than the upper parts, and the belly being whitish. The wings and tail are deeper grey, except for the outer corners of the tail which are white and particularly noticeable in flight. The beak is yellow, pink and grey. The adult length of this finch is about 14 cm (5.5 in).

== Distribution and habitat ==
The grey-crested finch is native to South America. Its range includes the Andean foothills of western Bolivia and northwestern Argentina, where it occurs at altitudes of between 1,500 and 3,100 m (4,900 and 10,200 ft). It typically occurs in arid habitats, in dry scrubland with tall cacti, dry valleys in the mountains, and on the fringes of agricultural land. It is common in Bolivia but less so in Argentina.

== Ecology ==
The grey-crested finch is generally seen in small groups foraging on the ground for seeds and small invertebrates. Little is known of its breeding habits but in Bolivia, juveniles have been seen in Cochabamba Department in December and June and in Santa Cruz Department in April.

== Status ==
The grey-crested finch has a wide range and is a common species. Although the population size has not been estimated, its trend seems to be stable, and the International Union for Conservation of Nature has assessed the bird's conservation status as being of "least concern".
