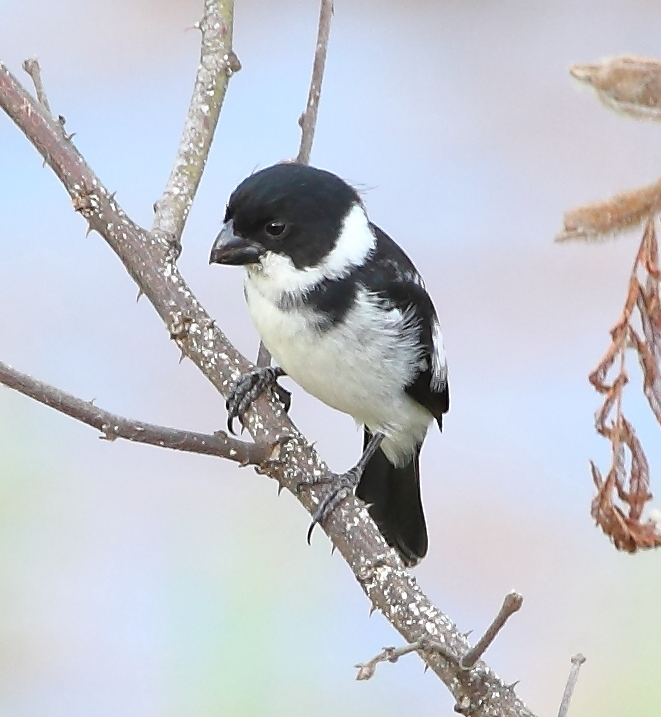
- A male wing-barred seedeater at Iranduba, Amazonas state, Brazil

Conservation status
- Least Concern (IUCN 3.1)

- Least Concern (IUCN 3.1)

Scientific classification
- Kingdom: Animalia
- Phylum: Chordata
- Class: Aves
- Order: Passeriformes
- Family: Thraupidae
- Genus: Sporophila
- Species: S. americana

Binomial name
- Sporophila americana (Gmelin, JF, 1789)
- Range of S. a. americana and S. a. dispar (see the Taxonomy and Status sections)

= Wing-barred seedeater =

Species of bird

The wing-barred seedeater (Sporophila americana) is a species of bird in the family Thraupidae, the tanagers and allies. It is found in every mainland South American country except Argentina, Chile, Paraguay, and Uruguay. It formerly was found on Tobago but has been extirpated.

== Taxonomy and systematics ==
The wing-barred seedeater has a complicated taxonomic history. It was formally described in 1789 with the binomial Loxia americana. By 1915 it had been reassigned to its present genus Sporophila. (Note: A subspecies was assigned to Sporophila americana in 1915 so the "parent" was in that genus by that time.) In the mid- to late twentieth century it and the variable seedeater (S. corvina) were considered conspecific. Based on a 1996 publication, in the early twenty-first century taxonomic systems began treating S. americana and S. murrallae as species separate from S. corvina. At this time genus Sporophila was a member of the family Fringillidae. By 1970 Sporophila had been reassigned to the family Emberizidae. Based on studies published between 1988 and 2011, beginning in 2012 the genus was moved to its present position in the tanager family Thraupidae.

The wing-barred seedeater's further taxonomy is unsettled. Beginning in 2022 the South American Classification Committee, IOC, and the Clements taxonomy reclassified S. murrallae as a subspecies of S. americana. As of September 2025 the most recent versions of these systems and AviList assign S. americana three subspecies:

- S. a. americana (Gmelin, JF, 1789)
- S. a. dispar Todd, 1922
- S. a. murallae Chapman, 1915

However, BirdLife International's Handbook of the Birds of the World (HBW) includes only americana and dispar as the wing-barred seedeater and continues to treat S. murallae as the full species "Caqueta seedeater".

This article follows the majority three-subspecies model.

== Description ==
The wing-barred seedeater is 10 to 11.5 cm (3.9 to 4.5 in) long and weighs 10 to 14 g (0.35 to 0.49 oz). It has a short thick bill with a rounded culmen. The species is sexually dimorphic. Adult males of the nominate subspecies S. a. americana have a mostly black head and neck with a white chin and throat that connect to a white collar below the nape. Their upperparts are mostly black with black speckles on a white rump. Their wings are mostly black with white tips on the median and greater coverts and white bases on the primaries. The white areas show as two wing bars and a patch on the folded wing respectively. Their tail is black. Their underparts are mostly white with some gray wash on the flanks and usually a thin broken black band through the breast. Adult females have a buffy brown crown and a paler, warmer, buffy brown face. Their nape, upperparts, wings, and tail are also buffy brown. Their throat, breast, and flanks are pale warm cinnamon and their belly and undertail coverts are a paler buff. Juveniles resemble adult females. Subspecies S. a. dispar is larger than the nominate. Males have a more nearly pure white rump and more white on their primaries. Females may have more grayish upperparts and whiter underparts, but not all descriptions support this. Males of S. a. murallae have white on the lesser wing coverts but not the median coverts and so have only one wing bar; they also have less white on the primaries than the nominate. Both sexes of all subspecies have a dark brown iris. Males have a black bill and legs; females have a blackish brown bill and legs.

== Distribution and habitat ==
The wing-barred seedeater has a disjunct distribution. The nominate subspecies and S. a. dispar have contiguous ranges but S. a. murallae's is separate. The nominate subspecies is found from southeastern Sucre, eastern Monagas, and northern and eastern Delta Amacuro states in far northeastern Venezuela east through the Guianas and far northern Brazil's Amapá, Pará, and Maranhão states. It formerly occurred on Tobago but has been extirpated there. Subspecies S. a. dispar is found primarily along the lower and middle Amazon River from central Pará west on the left bank to approximately Manaus and on the right bank further west to the Juruá River. There are also many scattered reports from further upstream almost to Peru, throughout the Amazon Basin south of the river, and in northeastern Bolivia, but not all of them have been confirmed as S. a. dispar. Subspecies S. a. murallae is found from the southern quarter of Colombia south through eastern Ecuador into the northeastern quadrant of Peru and from that area east into far western Brazil's Acra and far western Amazonas states.

The wing-barred seedeater inhabits a variety of grassy and shrubby landscapes such as pastures, plantations, roadsides, and river banks and islands. It also occurs in grasslands within Amazonia such as campina and in urban areas. In elevation it is found very near sea level in Venezuela and ranges from sea level to 400 m (1,300 ft) in Brazil. It also reaches 400 m (1,300 ft) in Colombia and Ecuador.

== Behavior ==
=== Movement ===
The wing-barred seedeater is believed to be a year-round resident in most of its range. However, it is known in Venezuela only between September and February. In addition, its apparent range expansions west and south in Amazonia "hint at the species’ capacity to move to a currently unknown extent".

=== Feeding ===
The wing-barred seedeater feeds primarily on the seeds of grasses and sedges, favoring those of genera Paspalum and Panicum. It includes smaller amounts of fruits, flower buds, and insects in its diet. It plucks seeds while clinging to stems. It is typically in pairs or small flocks but may also form large ones. Flocks may include other seed-eating species.

=== Breeding ===
The wing-barred seedeater's breeding season has not been defined, except that of S. a. americana includes January. Its nest is a cup made from plant fibers. The female alone builds the nest and incubates the eggs. The clutch size, incubation period, time to fledging, and other details of parental care are not known.

=== Vocalization ===
The song of subspecies S. a. murallae is "a variable series of jumbled but musical notes, usually quite long and rapidly delivered". That of S. a. americana is also pleasant and musical, "rapid trills and twittering sounds accented by pure whistles, sometimes tapering off to a chatter". Both make a cheeeu! call.

== Status ==
The IUCN follows HBW taxonomy and so has separately assessed the "wing-barred" (sensu stricto) and "Caqueta" seedeaters; both are of Least Concern. Both have large ranges and the population size of neither is known. The "wing-barred" population is believed to be stable and that of the "Caqueta" is believed to be increasing. The only known threat to either is capture for the pet trade. The species is considered "locally common" in Colombia, "uncommon" in Ecuador, "fairly common" in Peru, "scarce and local...(seasonal?)" in Venezuela, "frequent to uncommon" in western Brazil and along the Amazon there, and "uncommon to rare" in Maranhão. It is known in at least three protected areas in Amazonian Brazil.
