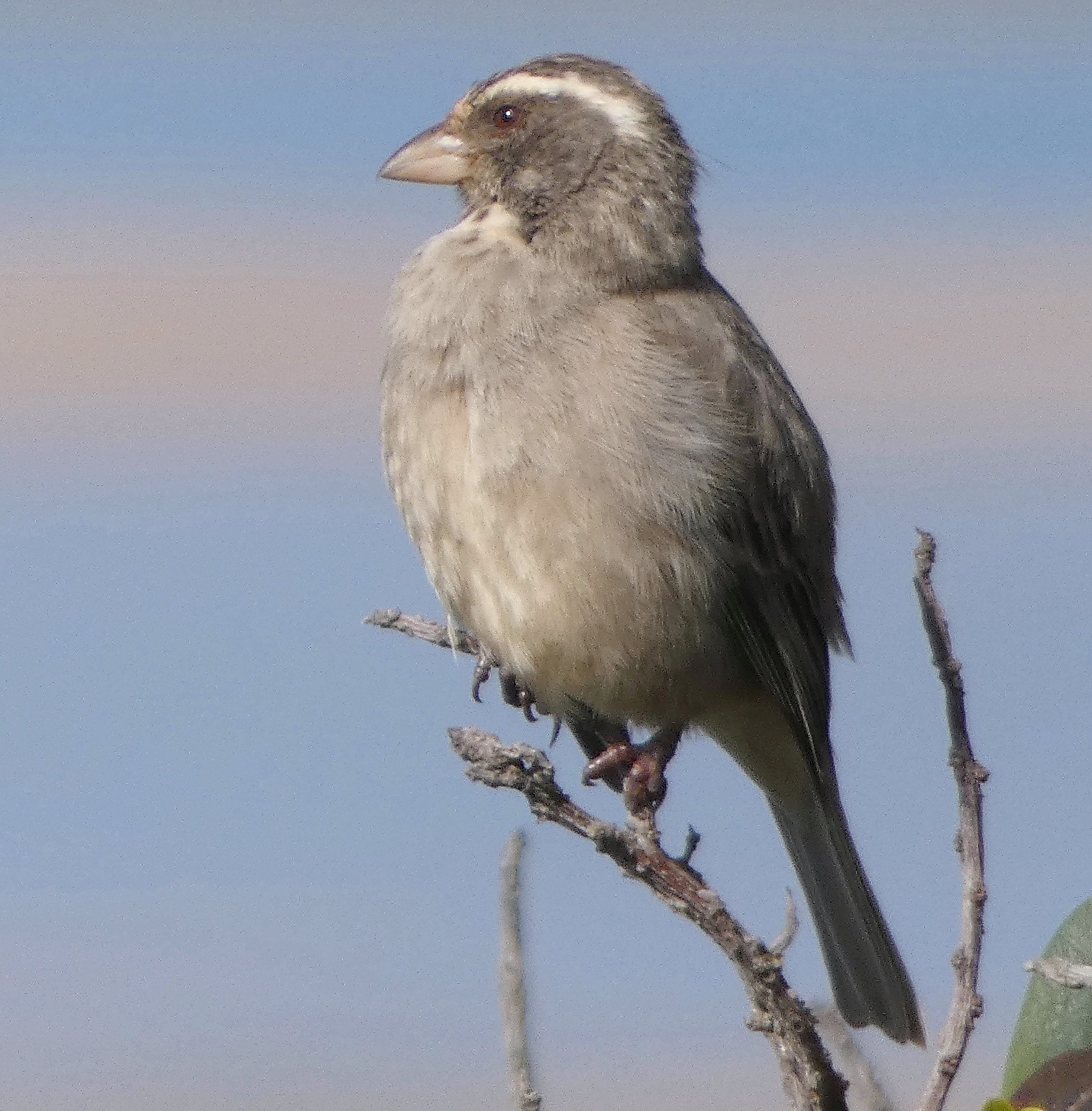
- Crithagra gularis humilis in the Western Cape

Conservation status
- Least Concern (IUCN 3.1)

Scientific classification
- Kingdom: Animalia
- Phylum: Chordata
- Class: Aves
- Order: Passeriformes
- Family: Fringillidae
- Subfamily: Carduelinae
- Genus: Crithagra
- Species: C. gularis

Binomial name
- Crithagra gularis (Smith, 1836)

Synonyms
- Serinus gularis

Audio
- Crithagra gularis gularis call from Gauteng, South Africa

= Streaky-headed seedeater =

Species of bird

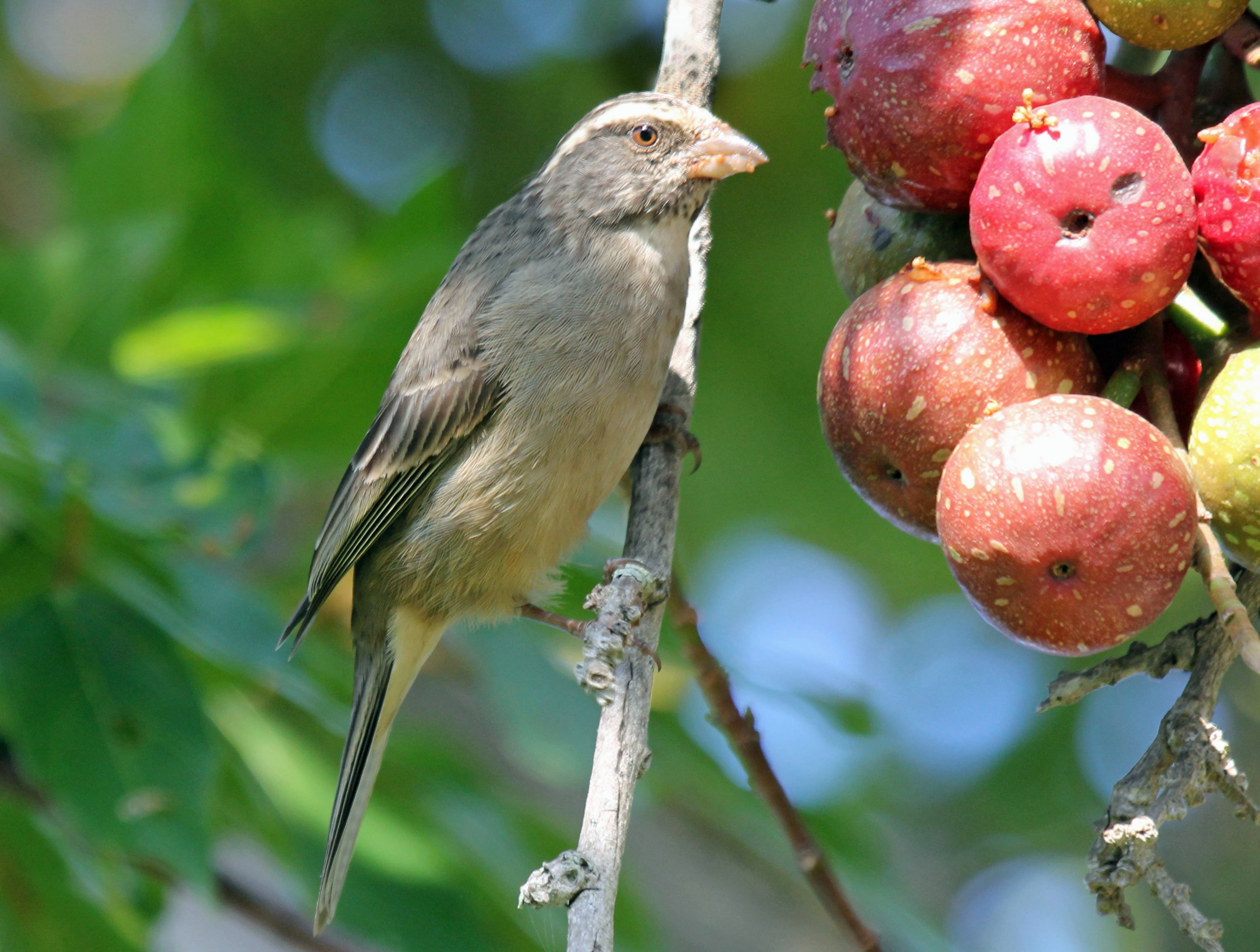
Crithagra gularis humilis feeding on the fruit of a Cape fig, Western Cape

The streaky-headed seedeater or streaky-headed canary (Crithagra gularis) is a small passerine bird in the finch family. It is an unobtrusive but widespread species in suitable habitats of southern Africa. Its presence in an area is revealed foremost by its callnotes.

== Taxonomy ==
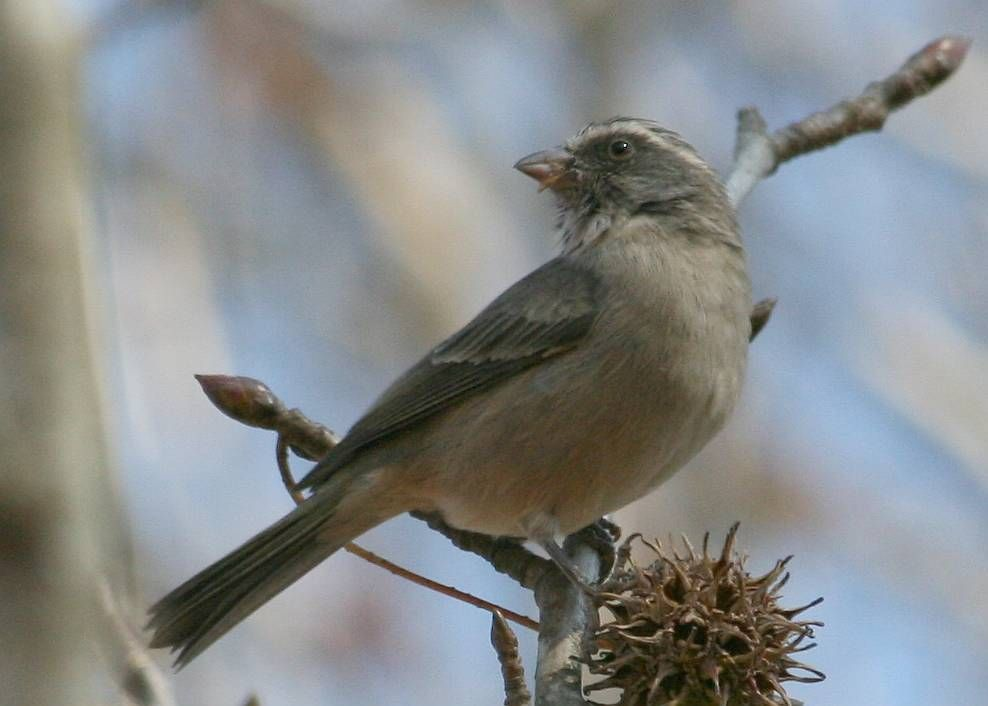
Crithagra gularis endemion feeding on redgum seeds in Pietermaritzburg, South Africa

The streaky-headed seedeater was formerly placed in the genus Serinus but phylogenetic analysis using mitochondrial and nuclear DNA sequences found that the genus was polyphyletic. The genus was therefore split and a number of species including the streaky-headed seedeater were moved to the resurrected genus Crithagra.

There are five recognized subspecies, differing mainly in the colour shade of the upperparts and underparts. C. g. humilis of the southwestern Cape has dusky plumage and indistinctly streaked upperparts.

- Crithagra gularis benguellensis (Reichenow, 1904) — n Namibia, s Angola
- Crithagra gularis endemion (Clancey, 1952) — Lesotho, Eswatini, e South Africa, s Mozambique
- Crithagra gularis gularis (Smith, A, 1836) — n South Africa, sw Botswana, s Zimbabwe
- Crithagra gularis humilis (Bonaparte, 1850) — s South Africa
- Crithagra gularis mendosa (Clancey, 1966) — nw Botswana, Zimbabwe, c Mozambique, s Zambia

Some authorities consider the West African seedeater (Crithagra canicapilla) as a subspecies of the streaky-headed seedeater. C. (g.) elgonensis, an isolated taxon occurring sparsely in the dry, eastern Ugandan woodlands and at Mt Elgon in Kenya, may be conspecific with either the West African seedeater or stripe-breasted seedeater.

== Description ==
The streaky-headed seedeater is 13–14 cm in length. The adult has brown upperparts with some faint streaking and a plain brown rump. The head has a finely white-streaked crown, dark face, and white supercilium and chin. The underparts are warm buff. The sexes are similar, but some females show a little breast streaking. The juvenile has less head streaking, a dull supercilium, more heavily streaked upperparts, and heavy streaking on the pale grey underparts.

== Distribution and habitat ==
Its habitat is open woodland and scrub, including savanna, orchards, and gardens. It builds a compact cup nest in scrub.

== Behaviour ==
The streaky-headed seedeater is usually seen in pairs, but can be gregarious, forming large flocks, alone or with other canary species. It feeds on soft fruit, weed seeds and buds, and sometimes takes insects. Large flocks can damage sunflower, millet and other cereal crops.

This is an unobtrusive finch, often perching inside bushes. Its call is a soft tseee, and the song is a wit-chee-chee-chee-cha cha cha cha chip, interspersed with mimicry of other species. There is also a tweu tweu tirrirrit-tink given in display flight.
