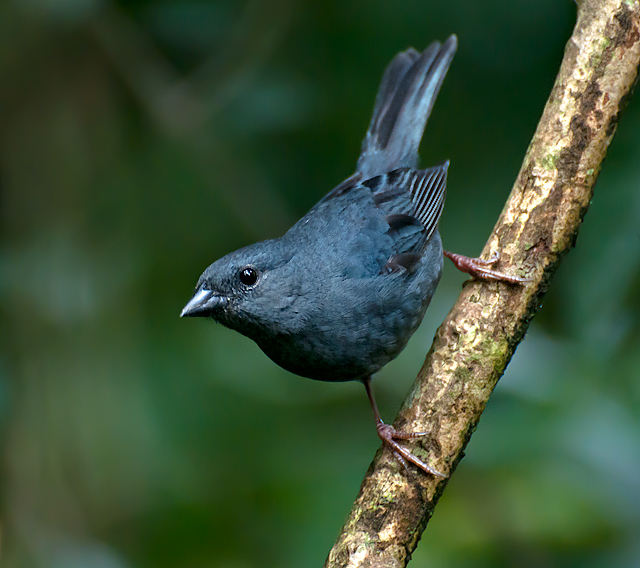
- A male uniform finch at Serra da Cantareira State Park, São Paulo, Brazil
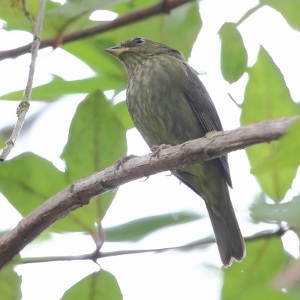
- A female uniform finch at São Luiz do Paraitinga, São Paulo State, Brazil

Conservation status
- Least Concern (IUCN 3.1)

Scientific classification
- Kingdom: Animalia
- Phylum: Chordata
- Class: Aves
- Order: Passeriformes
- Family: Thraupidae
- Genus: Haplospiza
- Species: H. unicolor

Binomial name
- Haplospiza unicolor Cabanis, 1851

= Uniform finch =

Species of bird

The uniform finch (Haplospiza unicolor) is a species of bird in the family Thraupidae.

It is found in the southern Atlantic Forest of Brazil, Paraguay and far northeastern Argentina. Its natural habitats are subtropical or tropical moist lowland forest and subtropical or tropical moist montane forest.
