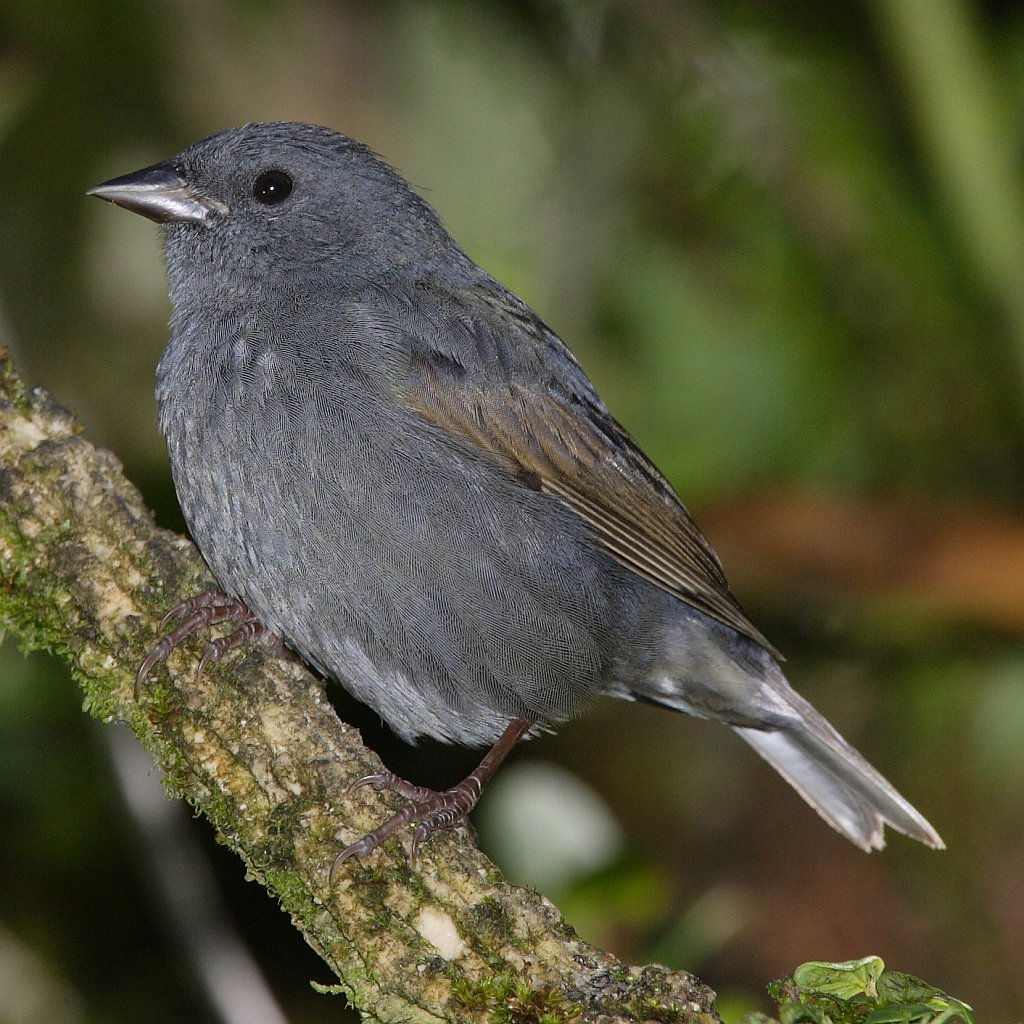
- male with leucistic tail.

Conservation status
- Least Concern (IUCN 3.1)

Scientific classification
- Kingdom: Animalia
- Phylum: Chordata
- Class: Aves
- Order: Passeriformes
- Family: Thraupidae
- Genus: Haplospiza
- Species: H. rustica

Binomial name
- Haplospiza rustica (Tschudi, 1844)

Synonyms
- Phrygilus rusticus; Spodiornis rusticus

= Slaty finch =

Species of bird

The slaty finch (Haplospiza rustica) is a bird species in the family Thraupidae (formerly in Emberizidae).

It is found in Central America and the northern Andes. Its natural habitats are subtropical or tropical moist montane forests and heavily degraded former forest.
