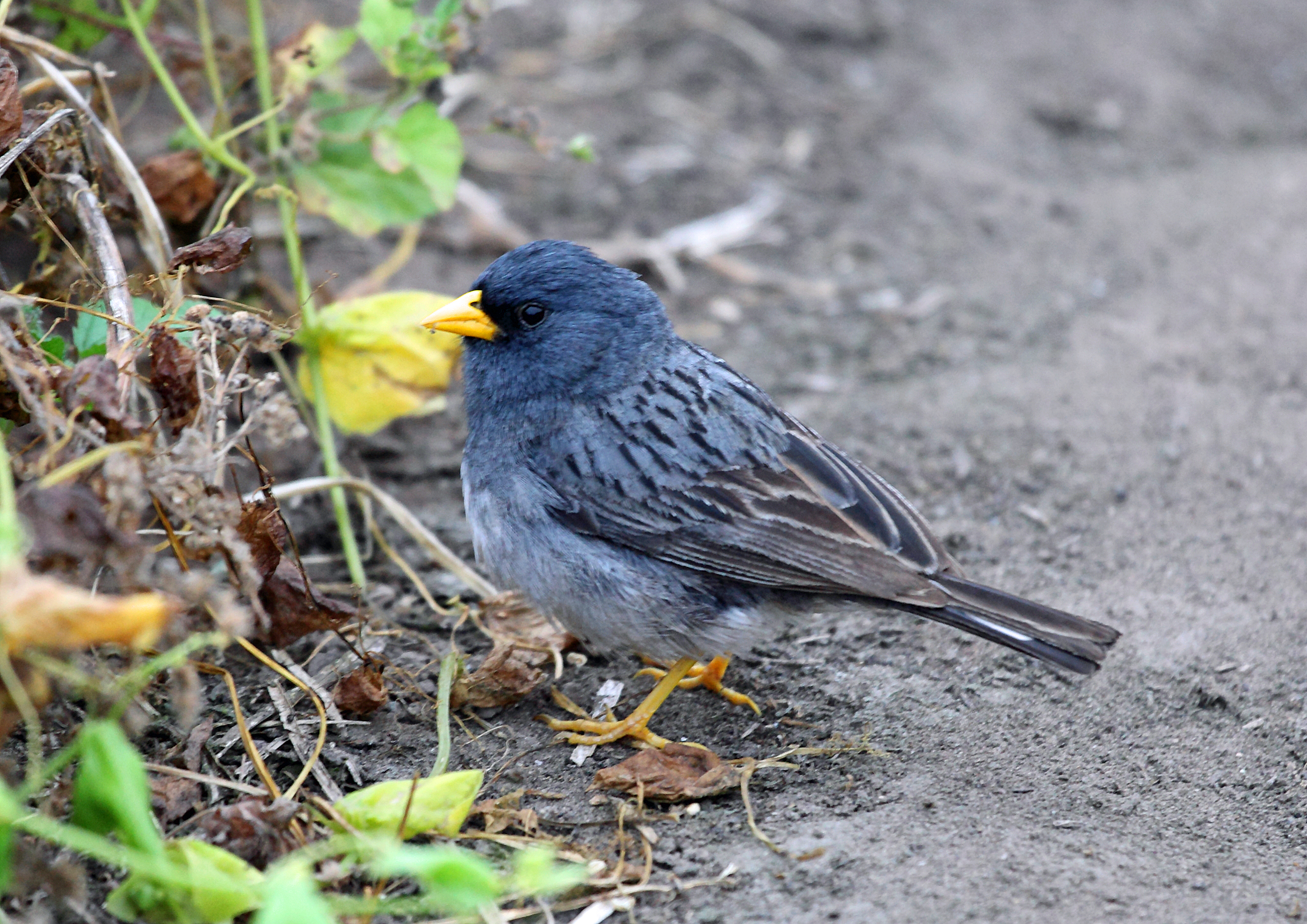

Conservation status
- Least Concern (IUCN 3.1)

Scientific classification
- Kingdom: Animalia
- Phylum: Chordata
- Class: Aves
- Order: Passeriformes
- Family: Thraupidae
- Genus: Catamenia
- Species: C. analis

Binomial name
- Catamenia analis (d'Orbigny & Lafresnaye, 1837)

Synonyms
- Linaria analis (protonym)

= Band-tailed seedeater =

Species of bird

The band-tailed seedeater (Catamenia analis) is a species of bird in the family Thraupidae. It is found in Argentina, Bolivia, Chile, Colombia, Ecuador, and Peru. Its natural habitats are subtropical or tropical high-altitude shrubland and heavily degraded former forest.

== Gallery ==
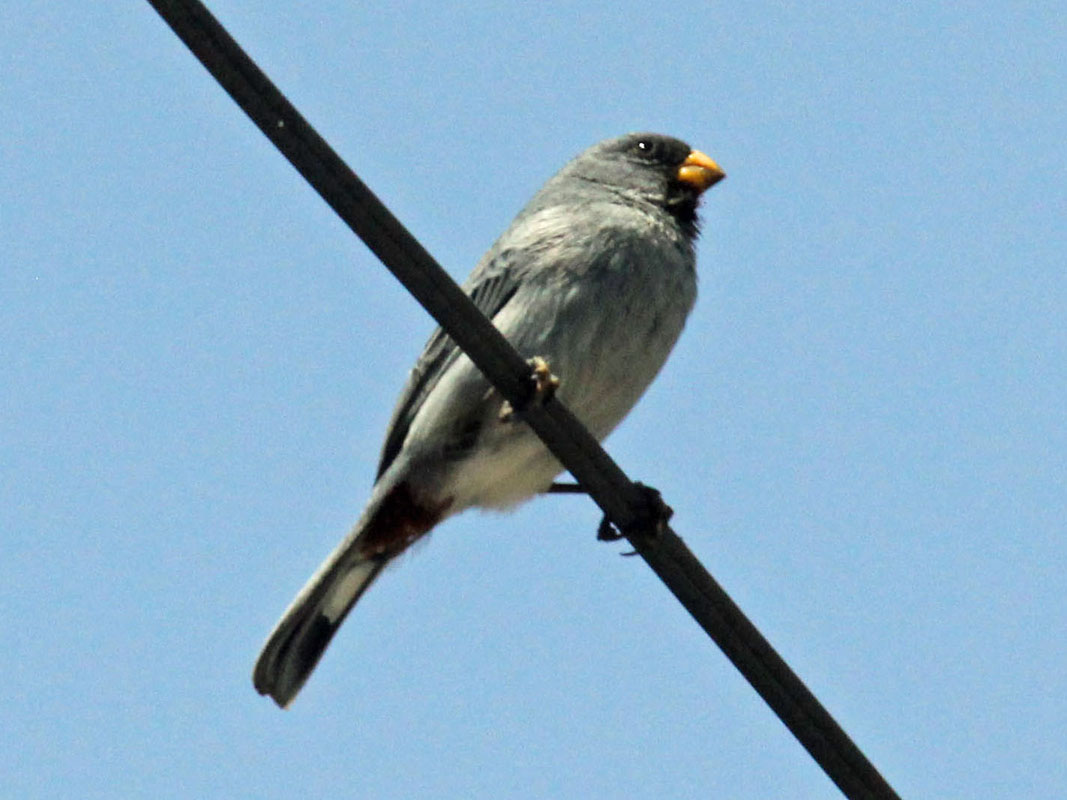
Male
