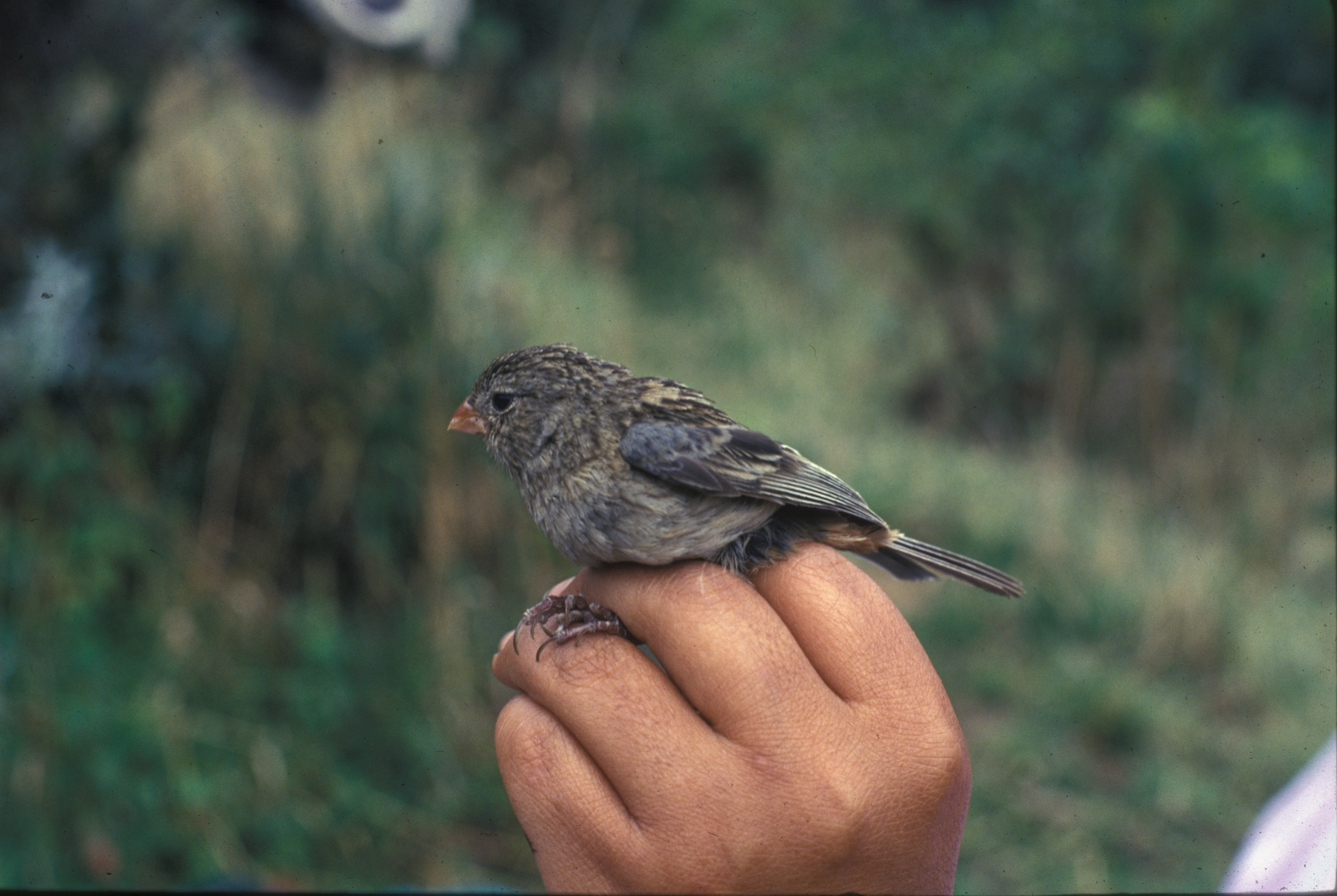
- Plain-colored seedeater (Catamenia inornata)

Scientific classification
- Kingdom: Animalia
- Phylum: Chordata
- Class: Aves
- Order: Passeriformes
- Family: Thraupidae
- Genus: Catamenia; Bonaparte, 1850

Type species
- Linaria analis d'Orbigny & Lafresnaye, 1837

Species
- See text

= Catamenia (bird) =

Genus of birds

Catamenia is a genus of atypical seedeaters. Formerly placed in the Emberizidae, they are now placed in the tanager family Thraupidae.

These species are found in more open areas in the Andes and the adjacent lowlands. Males are mainly gray; females are brownish and streaked. Both sexes have a distinctive chestnut crissum.

== Taxonomy and species list ==
The genus Catamenia was introduced in 1850 by the French naturalist Charles Lucien Bonaparte. The name is from the Ancient Greek katamēnia meaning "menstrual" or "menstruous". The type species was designated by the English zoologist George Robert Gray as the band-tailed seedeater in 1855. The genus now contains three species.

This genus was traditionally placed with other seed-eating birds in the family Emberizidae. A series of molecular phylogenetic studies published in the first decade of the 21st century found that many genera in Emberizidae were more closely related to the fruit eating birds in the family Thraupidae. In the reorganization of the family boundaries, Catamenia was one of several genera moved to Thraupidae.

A genetic study of the Thraupidae published in 2014 found that Catamenia is sister to the genus Diglossa in the subfamily Diglossinae. Within Catamenia, the band-tailed seedeater is sister to a clade containing the plain-colored seedeater and the paramo seedeater.

Image	Scientific name	Common name	Distribution
	Catamenia analis	Band-tailed seedeater	Argentina, Bolivia, Chile, Colombia, Ecuador, and Peru
	Catamenia inornata	Plain-colored seedeater	Argentina, Bolivia, Chile, Colombia, Ecuador, Peru, and Venezuela
	Catamenia homochroa	Paramo seedeater	Bolivia, Brazil, Colombia, Ecuador, Peru, and Venezuela
