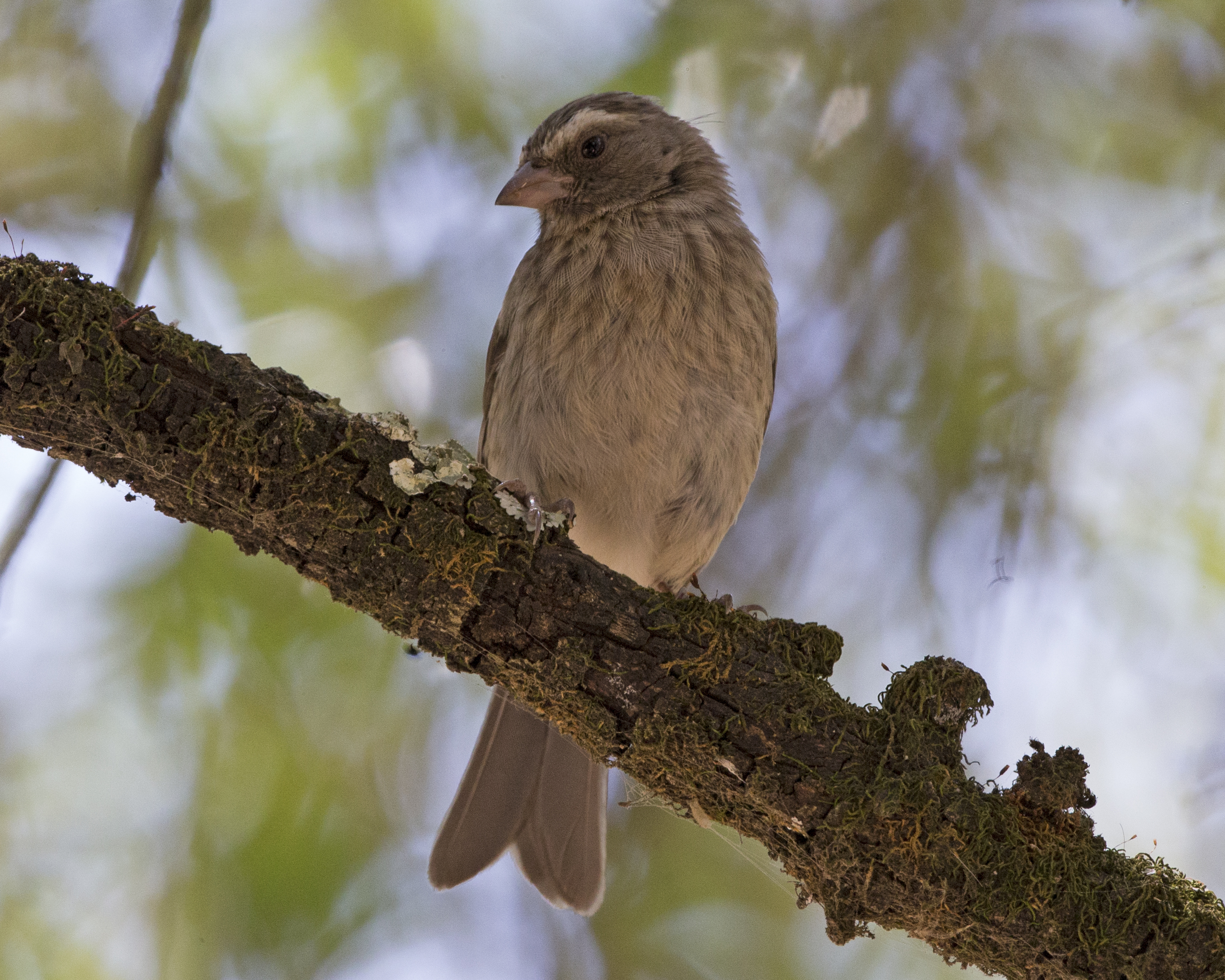

Conservation status
- Least Concern (IUCN 3.1)

Scientific classification
- Domain: Eukaryota
- Kingdom: Animalia
- Phylum: Chordata
- Class: Aves
- Order: Passeriformes
- Family: Fringillidae
- Subfamily: Carduelinae
- Genus: Crithagra
- Species: C. striatipectus

Binomial name
- Crithagra striatipectus (Sharpe, 1891)

= Stripe-breasted seedeater =

Species of bird

The stripe-breasted seedeater (Crithagra striatipectus) is a species of finch in the family Fringillidae. It is native to Sudan, Ethiopia, and Kenya.

The stripe-breasted seedeater was formerly conspecific with Reichard's seedeater (Crithagra reichardi), but was split as a distinct species by the IOC in 2021.
