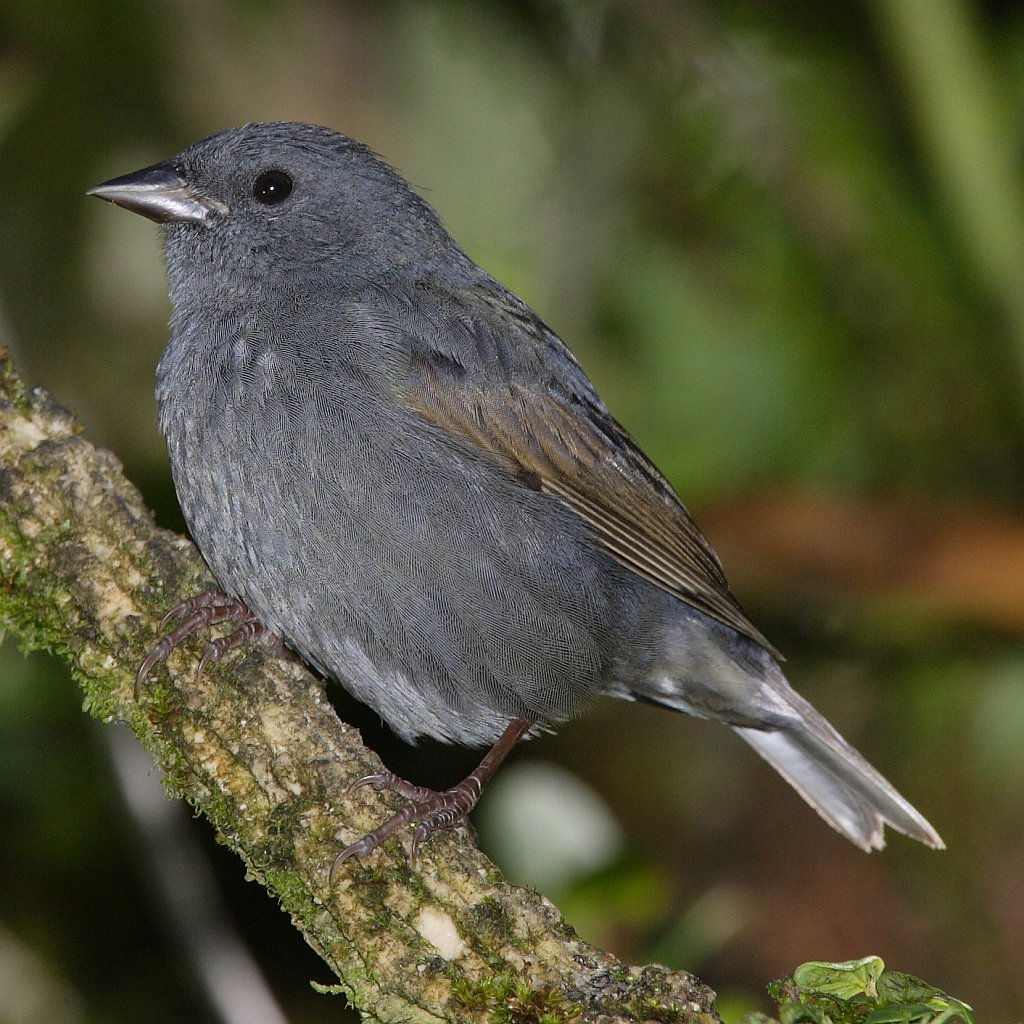
- Slaty finch (male) with leucistic tail.

Scientific classification
- Kingdom: Animalia
- Phylum: Chordata
- Class: Aves
- Order: Passeriformes
- Family: Thraupidae
- Genus: Haplospiza; Cabanis, 1851

Type species
- Haplospiza unicolor Cabanis, 1851

Species
- See text

= Haplospiza =

Genus of birds

Haplospiza is a small genus of birds in the tanager family Thraupidae. Formerly classified in the bunting and American sparrow family Emberizidae, more recent studies have shown it to belong in the Thraupidae. Its two members breed in subtropical or tropical moist forest in Central and South America. They are often associated with bamboo.

== Taxonomy and species list ==
The genus Haplospiza was introduced in 1851 by the German ornithologist Jean Cabanis with the uniform finch as the type species. The name combines the Ancient Greek haploos meaning "plain" with spiza meaning "finch".

The genus contains the following two species:

Image	Common name	Scientific name	Distribution
	Slaty finch	Haplospiza rustica	Central America and the northern Andes.
	Uniform finch	Haplospiza unicolor	Brazil, Paraguay and far northeastern Argentina

A molecular phylogenetic study published in 2014 found that H. unicolor and H. rustica are not sister species.
