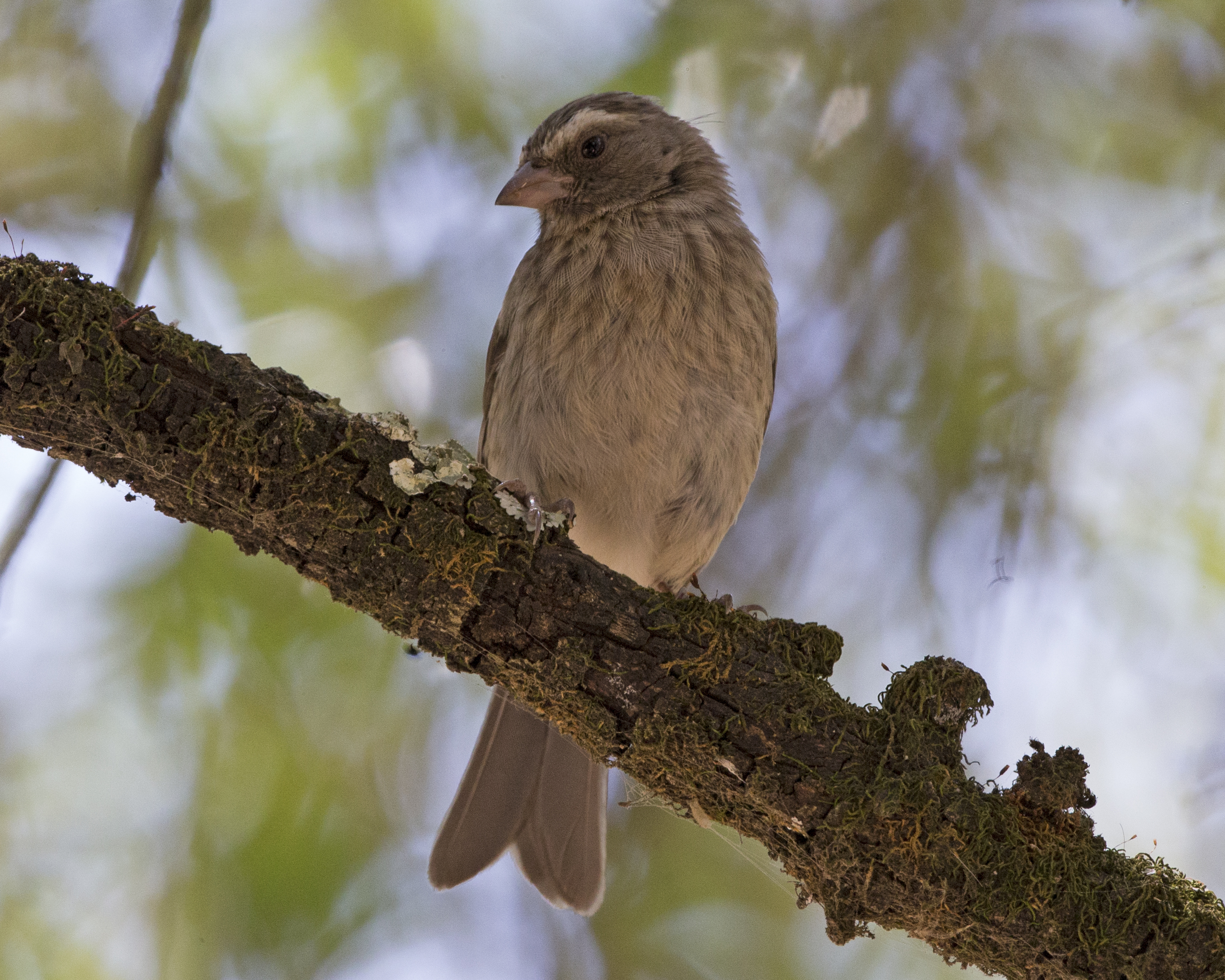

Conservation status
- Least Concern (IUCN 3.1)

Scientific classification
- Kingdom: Animalia
- Phylum: Chordata
- Class: Aves
- Order: Passeriformes
- Family: Fringillidae
- Subfamily: Carduelinae
- Genus: Crithagra
- Species: C. reichardi

Binomial name
- Crithagra reichardi (Reichenow, 1882)

Synonyms
- Serinus reichardi

= Reichard's seedeater =

Species of bird

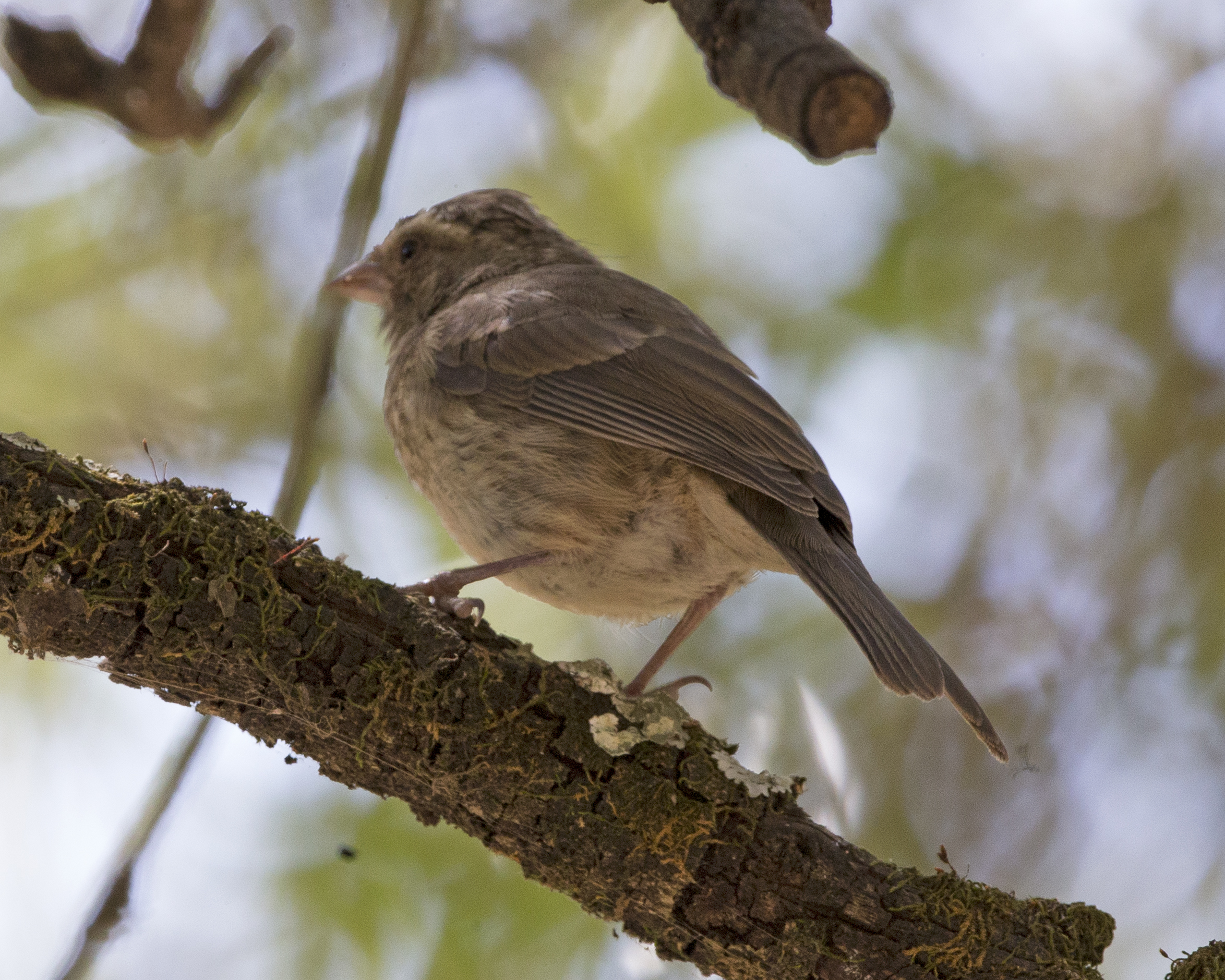
Reichard’s Seedeater

Reichard's seedeater (Crithagra reichardi) is a species of finch in the family Fringillidae. It is native to the miombo savanna (mainly Zambia, Malawi and Tanzania). It is named after the German explorer Paul Reichard.

Reichard's seedeater was formerly placed in the genus Serinus but phylogenetic analysis using mitochondrial and nuclear DNA sequences found that the genus was polyphyletic. The genus was therefore split and a number of species including Reichard's seedeater were moved to the resurrected genus Crithagra. The stripe-breasted seedeater (C. striatipectus) was formerly conspecific, but was split as a distinct species by the IOC in 2021.
