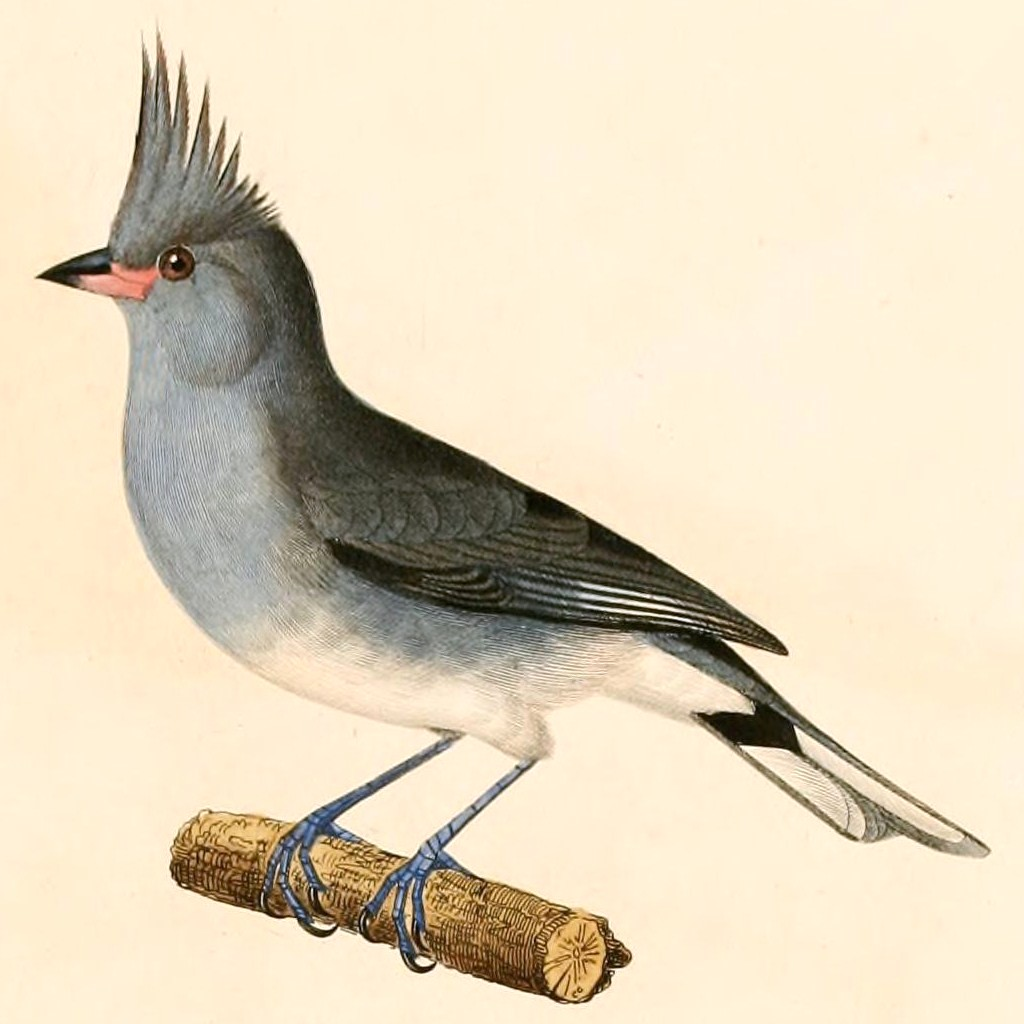
- Grey-crested finch (Lophospingus griseocristatus)

Scientific classification
- Kingdom: Animalia
- Phylum: Chordata
- Class: Aves
- Order: Passeriformes
- Family: Thraupidae
- Genus: Lophospingus; Cabanis, 1878

Type species
- Gubernatrix pusilla Burmeister, 1860

= Lophospingus =

Genus of birds

Lophospingus is a small genus of South American birds in the tanager family Thraupidae.

These finches are mostly gray and have prominent upstanding crests. They live in open habitats in southern South America.

== Taxonomy and species list ==
The genus Lophospingus was introduced in 1878 by the German ornithologists Jean Cabanis with the black-crested finch as the type species. The genus name combines the Ancient Greek lophos meaning "crest" and spingos meaning "finch".

The genus contains the following two species:

Image	Scientific name	Common name	Distribution
	Lophospingus griseocristatus	Grey-crested finch	Bolivia and northwestern Argentina
	Lophospingus pusillus	Black-crested finch	Bolivia, Paraguay and northern Argentina.
