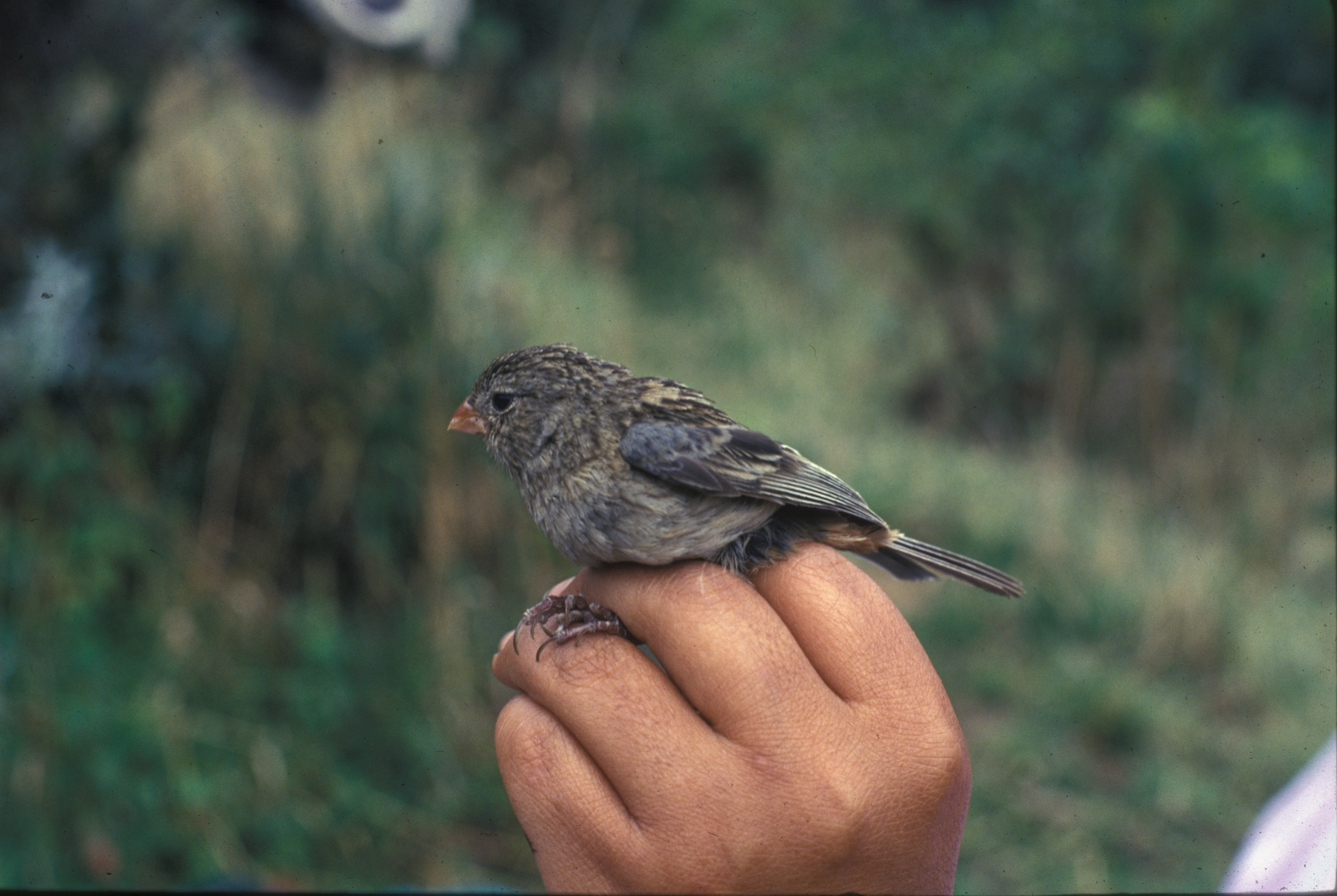

Conservation status
- Least Concern (IUCN 3.1)

Scientific classification
- Kingdom: Animalia
- Phylum: Chordata
- Class: Aves
- Order: Passeriformes
- Family: Thraupidae
- Genus: Catamenia
- Species: C. inornata

Binomial name
- Catamenia inornata (Lafresnaye, 1847)

= Plain-colored seedeater =

Species of bird

The plain-colored seedeater (Catamenia inornata) is a species of bird in the family Thraupidae.

It is found in Argentina, Bolivia, Chile, Colombia, Ecuador, Peru, and Venezuela. Its natural habitats are subtropical or tropical moist montane forests, subtropical or tropical high-altitude shrubland, and subtropical or tropical high-altitude grassland.

== Gallery ==
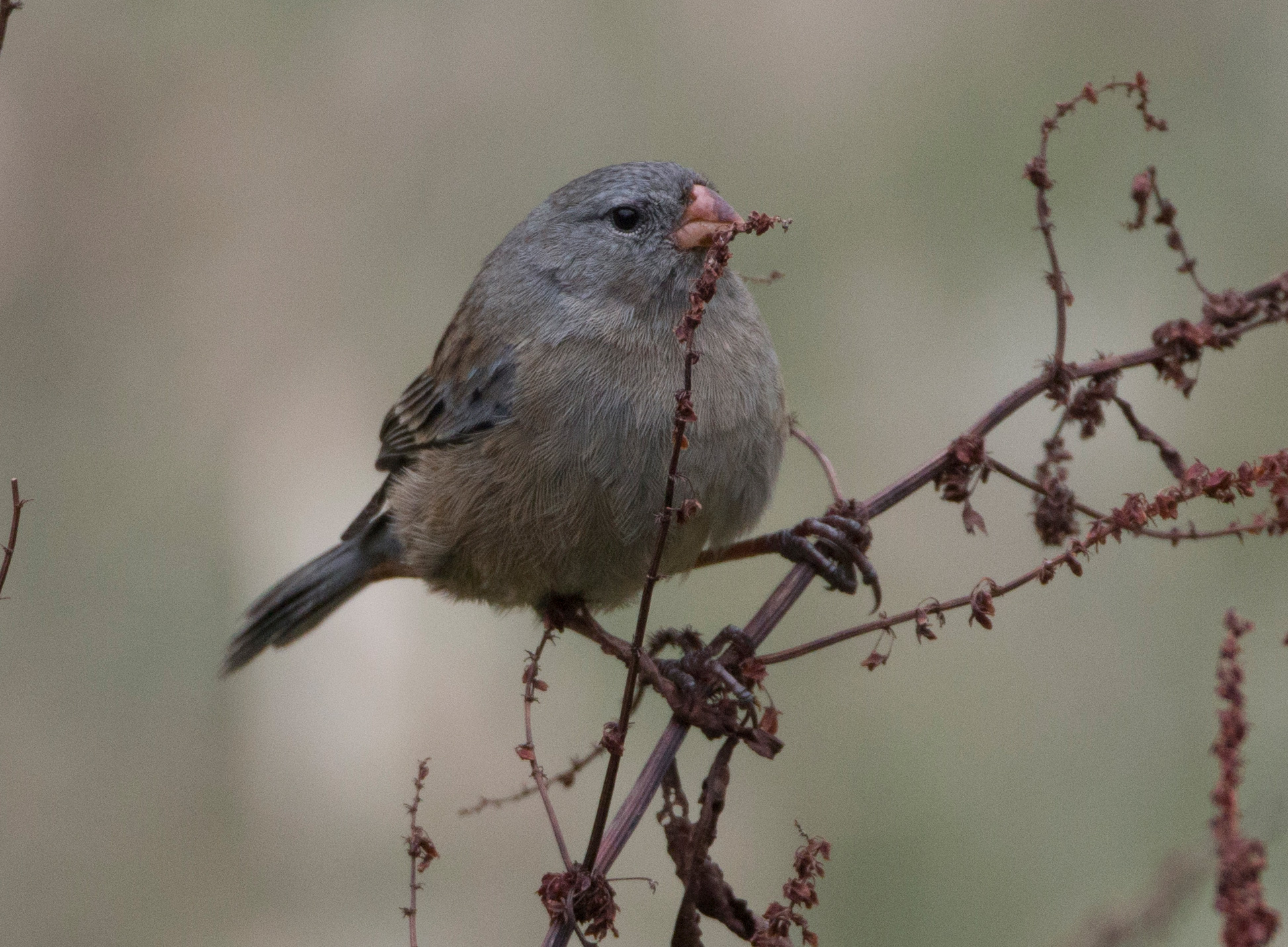
Male, Cajas National Park, Ecuador

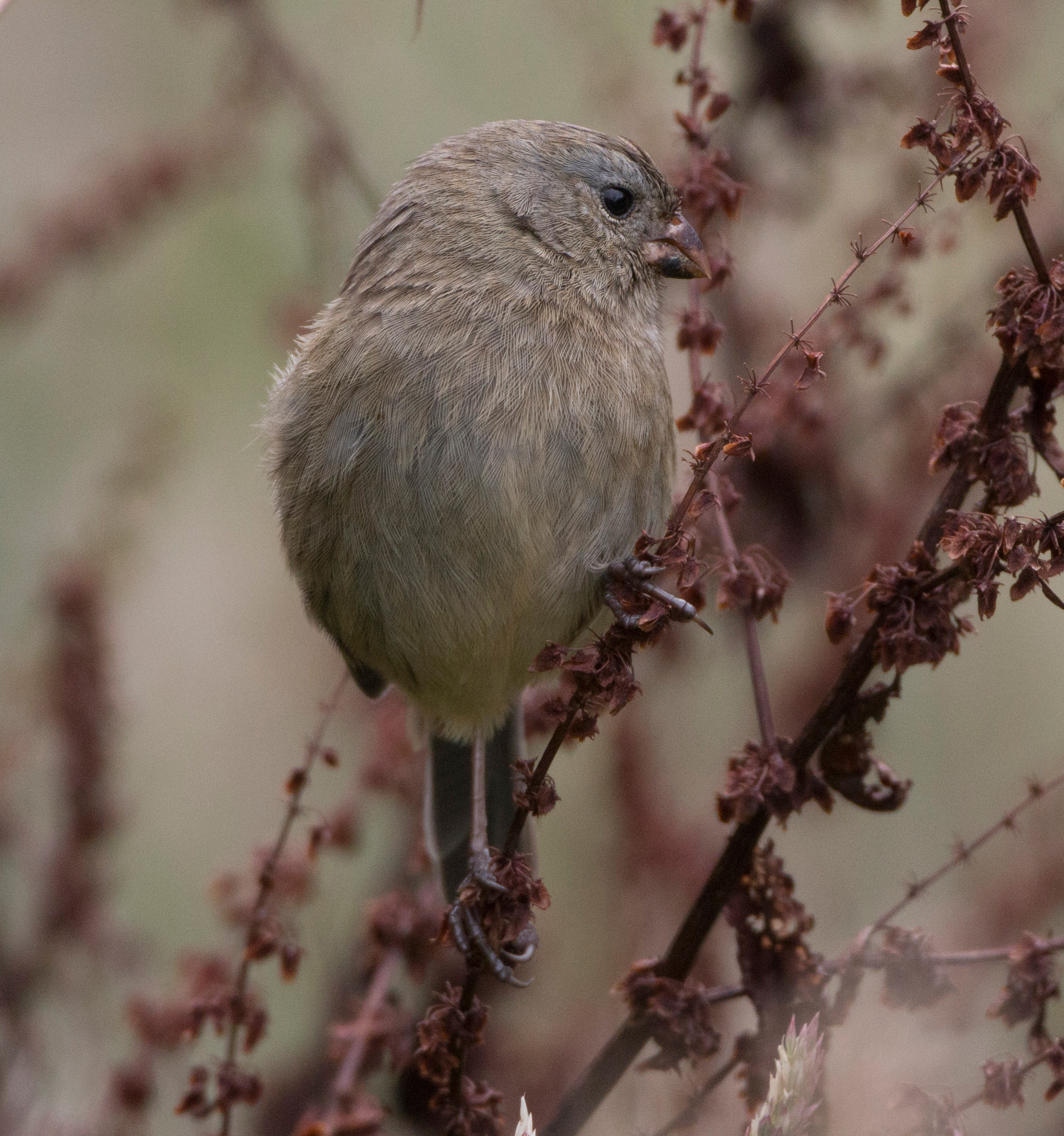
Female, Cajas National Park, Ecuador
