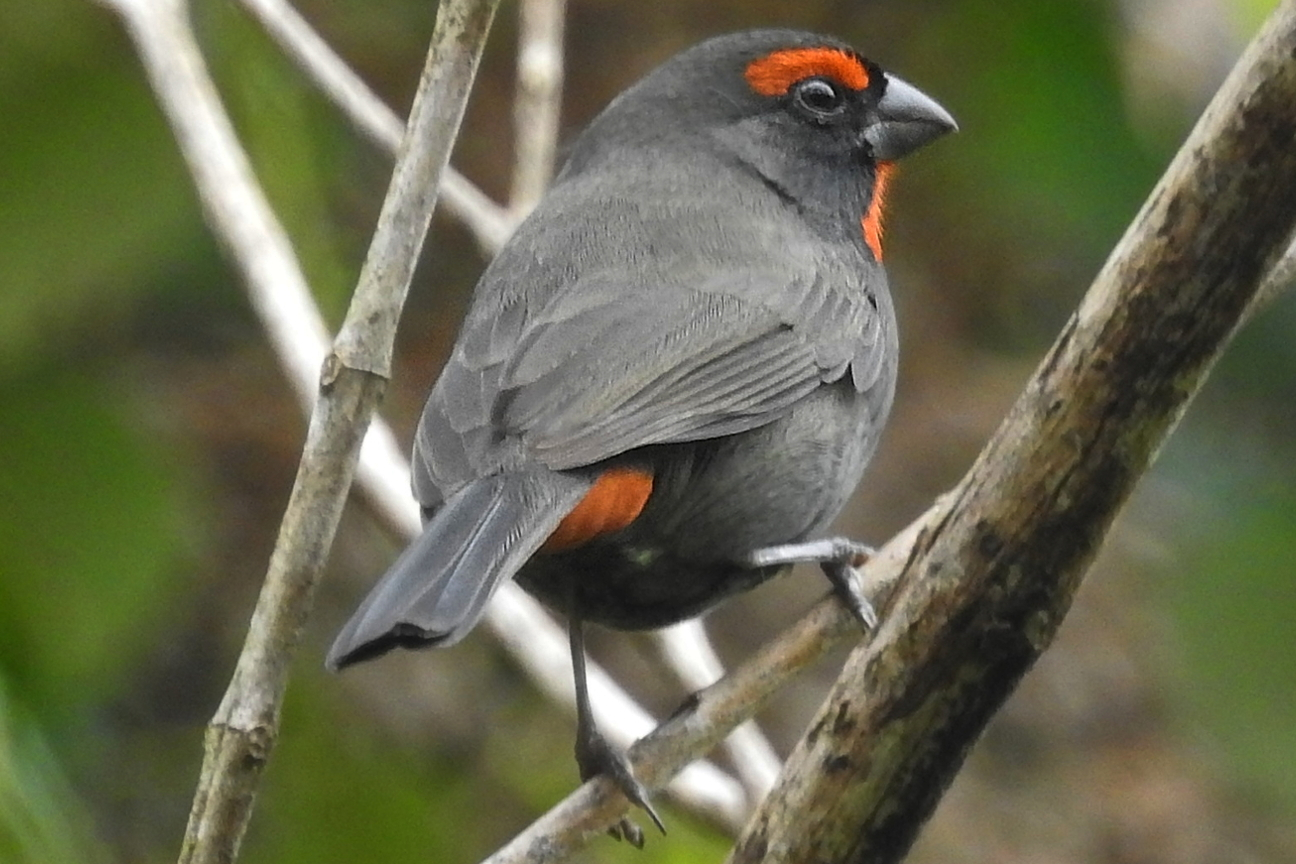
- Male M. v. affinis, Dominican Republic
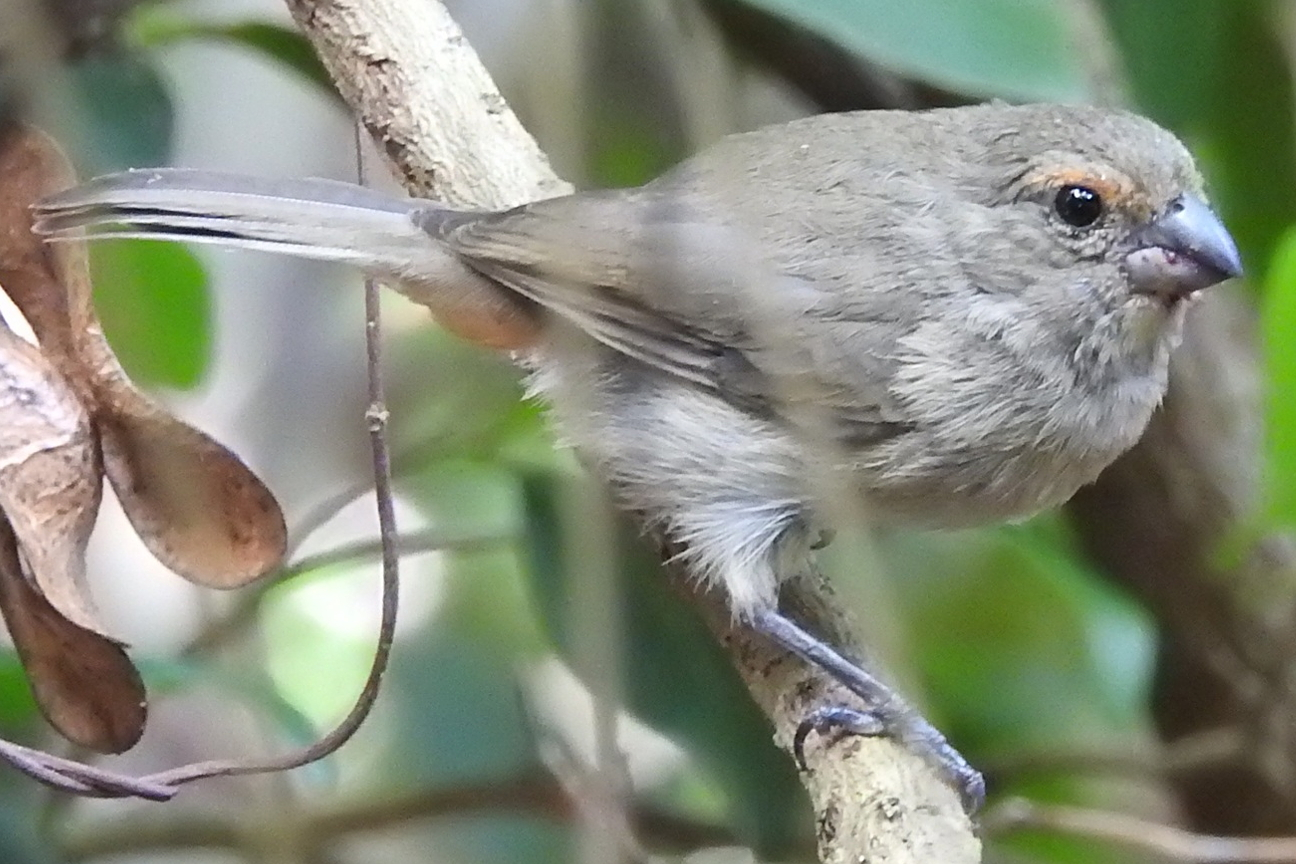
- Female M. v. violacea, Bahamas

Conservation status
- Least Concern (IUCN 3.1)

Scientific classification
- Kingdom: Animalia
- Phylum: Chordata
- Class: Aves
- Order: Passeriformes
- Family: Thraupidae
- Genus: Melopyrrha
- Species: M. violacea

Binomial name
- Melopyrrha violacea (Linnaeus, 1758)

Synonyms
- See text

= Greater Antillean bullfinch =

Species of bird

The Greater Antillean bullfinch (Melopyrrha violacea) is a species of bird in the family Thraupidae, the tanagers and allies. It is found in the Bahamas, Hispaniola (the Dominican Republic, Haiti, and their offshore islands), Jamaica, and the Turks and Caicos Islands.

== Taxonomy and systematics ==
The Greater Antillean bullfinch has a complicated taxonomic history. It was formally described by the Swedish naturalist Carl Linnaeus in 1758 in the tenth edition of his Systema Naturae under the binomial name Loxia violacea. The specific epithet violacea is from Latin violaceus meaning "violet-colored". Linnaeus based his description on "The Purple Gross-beak" that had been described and illustrated by Mark Catesby in 1731. The type locality is the Bahamas. The species was later placed in the genus Loxigilla.

A molecular phylogenetic study published in 2014 found that Loxigilla was polyphyletic and in the subsequent rearrangement, by 2020 most taxonomic systems had moved the Greater Antillean bullfinch and the Puerto Rican bullfinch to Melopyrrha. In 2016 BirdLife International's Handbook of the Birds of the World (HBW) had moved the two species to genus Pyrrhulagra but in 2022 moved them to Melopyrrha.

As of late 2025 the Greater Antillean bullfinch's further taxonomy remained unsettled. The IOC, AviList, and HBW assign it these five subspecies:

- M. v. violacea (Linnaeus, 1758)
- M. v. ofella (Buden, 1986)
- M. v. maurella (Wetmore, 1929)
- M. v. affinis (Ridgway, 1898)
- M. v. ruficollis (Gmelin, JF, 1789)

However, as of late 2025 the Clements taxonomy included M. v. ofella within the nominate M. v. violacea and recognizes M. v. parishi which the others include within M. v. affinis.

This article includes data on all six subspecies.

== Description ==
The Greater Antillean bullfinch is 13.2 to 17.5 cm (5.2 to 6.9 in) long and weighs 18 to 32.4 g (0.63 to 1.1 oz). The species is sexually dimorphic though not dramatically so. Adult males of the nominate M. v. violacea are black except for a short red-orange supercilium and red-orange throat and undertail coverts. Adult females are a duller, more slaty black than males, especially on their upperparts.

The other subspecies of the Greater Antillean bullfinch differ little from the nominate. M. v. affinis is smaller and glossier and M. v. maurella is larger than affinis and glossier than the nominate. Subspecies M. v. ruficollis differs the most; it is larger, grayer, and duller than the nominate with a paler supercilium and throat. M. v. ofella is the smallest subspecies but otherwise like the nominate. M. v. parishi is described as smaller than the nominate "but this is not confirmed by any measurements of topotypes". Both sexes of all subspecies have a dark iris, a short, thick dark gray bill, and dusky legs and feet.

== Distribution and habitat ==
Even when they agree on the subspecies of the Greater Antillean bullfinch, sources differ on some of their ranges:

- M. v. violacea: when ofella is treated separately, the northern and central Bahamas; when ofella is included, the Bahamas and Caicos Islands
- M. v. ofella: central and eastern Caicos Islands in the southern Bahamas
- M. v. maurella: Tortue; Tortue and Gonâve Islands of Haiti and Saona Island of the Dominican Republic
- M. v. affinis: with parishi, Hispaniola and small islands off its south coast; without parishi, Hispaniola and Catalina Island of the Dominican Republic
- M. v. parishi: Île-à-Vache of Haiti and Beata Island of the Dominican Republic
- M. v. ruficollis: Jamaica

The Greater Antillean bullfinch inhabits "[d]ense thickets and undergrowth at all elevations from dry coastal scrub to wet mountain forests, including gardens". Other sources say its elevational ceiling is 2,000 m (6,600 ft).

== Behavior ==
=== Movement ===
The Greater Antillean bullfinch is a sedentary year-round resident.

=== Feeding ===
The Greater Antillean bullfinch feeds primarily on fruits and seeds but also includes flowers and snails in its diet. It usually feeds in dense vegetation and probably on or near the ground.

=== Breeding ===
The Greater Antillean bullfinch breeds from March to beyond June. It usual nest is a sphere with a side entrance; sometimes it is an open cup. The nest is made from twigs and leaves lined with bromeliads and other fine plant parts. It is placed in a tree cavity, on a branch, in a shrub, or in a clump of grass. The clutch is three or four eggs that are very pale bluish white with red- and yellow-brown markings. The incubation period, time to fledging, and details of parental care are not known.

=== Vocalization ===
The Greater Antillean bullfinch's voice is a "[s]hrill, insect-like t'zeet, t'seet, t'seet, tseet, seet, seet, seet, seet, seet". It also makes a "thin spit".

== Status ==
The IUCN has assessed the Greater Antillean bullfinch as being of Least Concern. It has a large range; its population size is not known but is believed to be stable. No immediate threats have been identified. It is considered common on most of the larger islands in its range. The "status of populations on smaller islands [are] not known".
