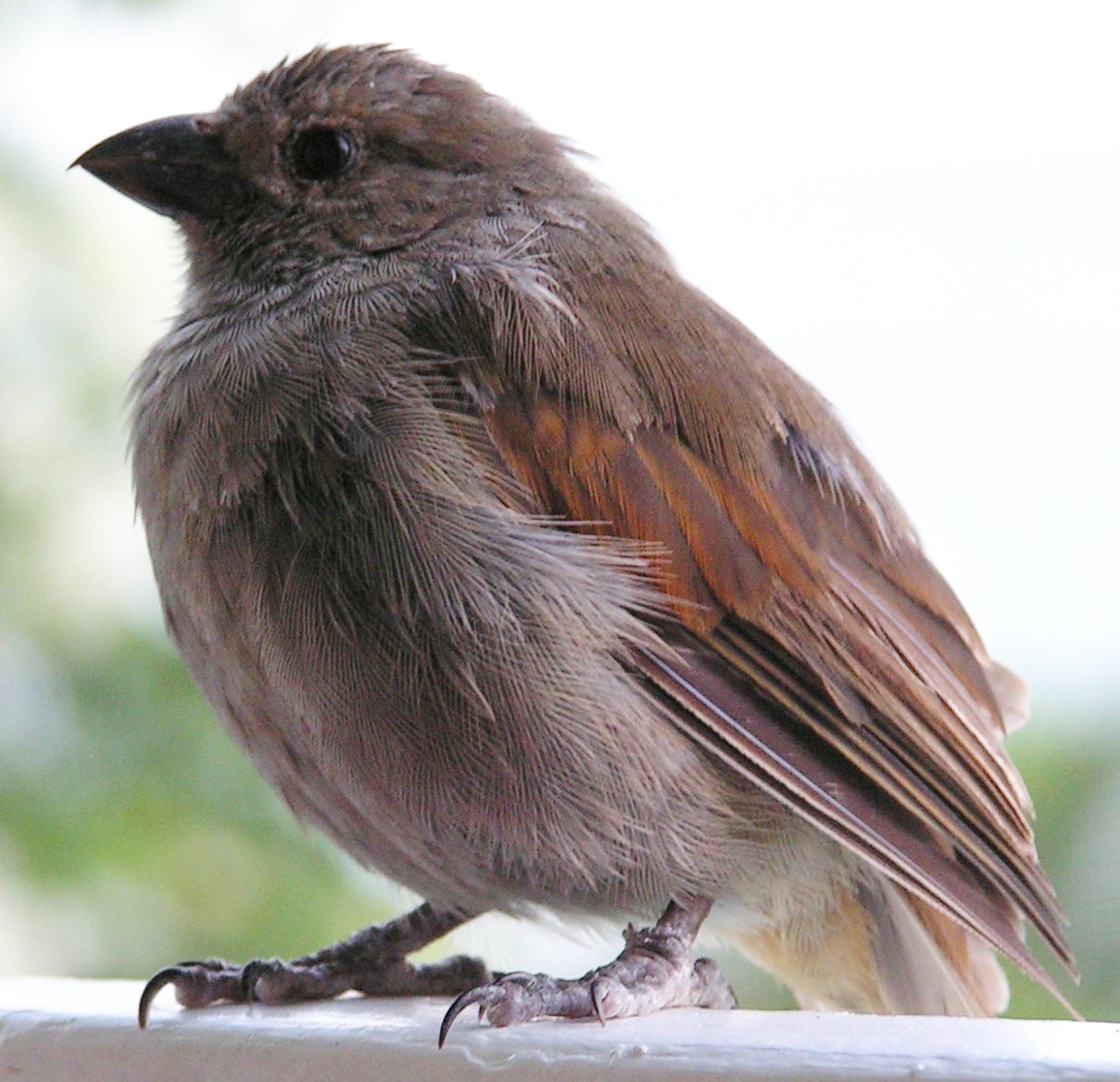
- Barbados bullfinch (Loxigilla barbadensis)

Scientific classification
- Kingdom: Animalia
- Phylum: Chordata
- Class: Aves
- Order: Passeriformes
- Family: Thraupidae
- Genus: Loxigilla; Lesson, 1831

Type species
- Fringilla noctis Linnaeus, 1766

Species
- See text

Synonyms
- Pyrrhulagra

= Loxigilla =

Genus of birds

Loxigilla is a genus of passerine birds in the tanager family Thraupidae. The two species are both endemic to the Lesser Antilles.

== Taxonomy ==
The genus Loxigilla was introduced in 1831 by the French naturalist René Lesson. The type species was later designated as the Lesser Antillean bullfinch by George Robert Gray in 1855. The name is a combination of two genera introduced by Carl Linnaeus in 1758: Loxia for the crossbills and Fringilla for a group of finches. Although formerly placed with the buntings and New World sparrows in the family Emberizidae, molecular phylogenetic studies have shown that the genus is a member of the tanager family Thraupidae and belongs to the subfamily Coerebinae which also includes Darwin's finches.

The genus contains two species, both endemic to the Lesser Antilles:

Genus Loxigilla – Lesson, 1831 – two species
Common name	Scientific name and subspecies	Range	Size and ecology	IUCN status and estimated population
Lesser Antillean bullfinch Male Female	Loxigilla noctis (Linnaeus, 1766) Five subspecies: L. n. coryi (Ridgway, 1898); L. n. ridgwayi (Cory, 1892); L. n. desiradensis Danforth, 1937; L. n. dominicana (Ridgway, 1898); L. n. noctis (Linnaeus, 1766); L. n. sclateri Allen, JA, 1880; L. n. crissalis (Ridgway, 1898); L. n. grenadensis (Cory, 1892)	Saint Barth, Saint Martin, Anguilla, Antigua and Barbuda, Dominica, Grenada, Guadeloupe, Martinique, Montserrat, Netherlands Antilles, Saint Kitts and Nevis, Saint Lucia, Saint Vincent and the Grenadines, the British Virgin Islands, and the U.S. Virgin Islands.	Size: Habitat: Diet:	LC
Barbados bullfinch	Loxigilla barbadensis Cory, 1886	Barbados	Size: Habitat: Diet:	LC

The Greater Antillean bullfinch and Puerto Rican bullfinch were formerly placed in this genus, but are now placed in Melopyrrha.
