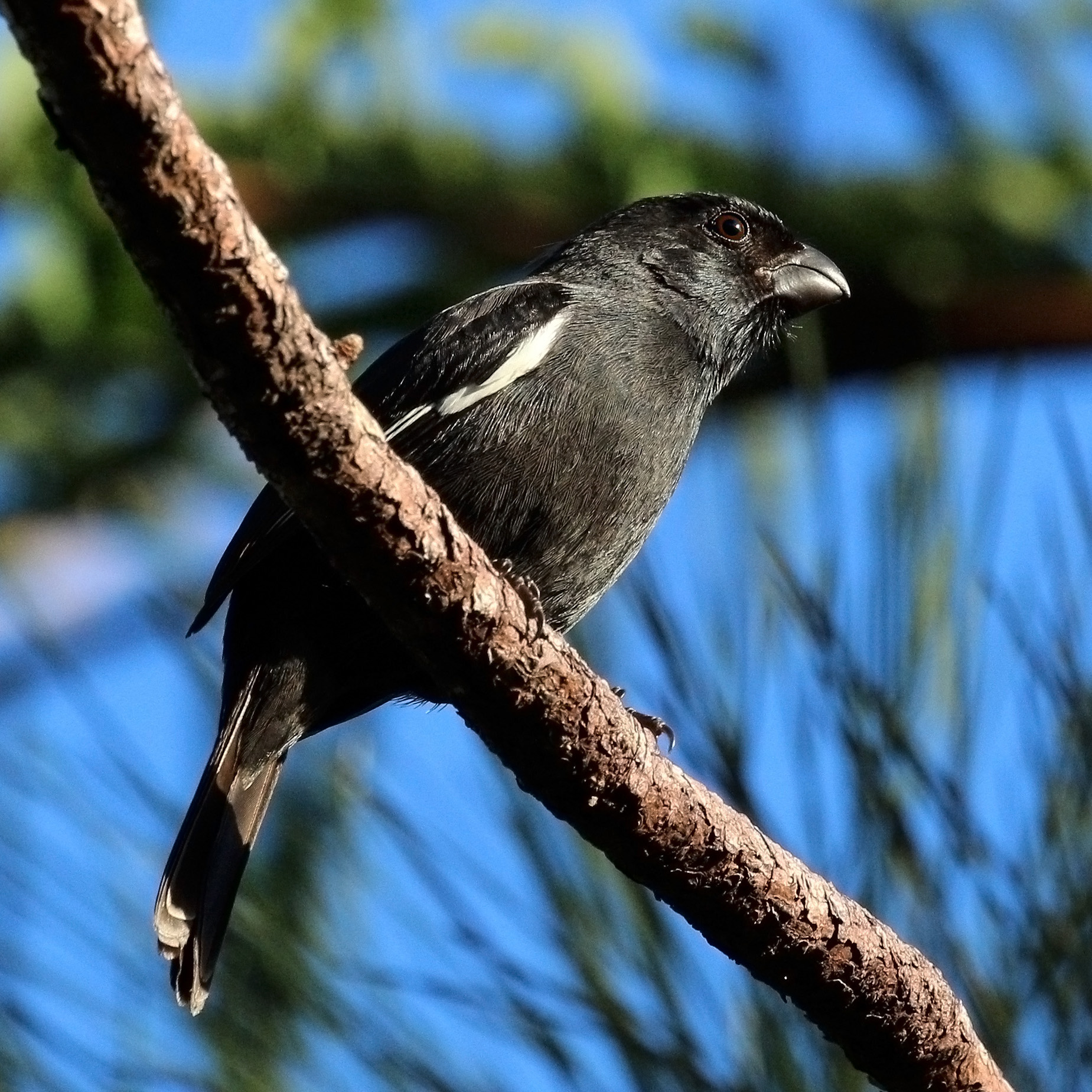

Conservation status
- Near Threatened (IUCN 3.1)

Scientific classification
- Kingdom: Animalia
- Phylum: Chordata
- Class: Aves
- Order: Passeriformes
- Family: Thraupidae
- Genus: Melopyrrha
- Species: M. nigra

Binomial name
- Melopyrrha nigra (Linnaeus, 1758)

Synonyms
- See text

= Cuban bullfinch =

Species of bird

The Cuban bullfinch (Melopyrrha nigra) is a Near Threatened species of bird in the family Thraupidae, the tanagers and allies. It is endemic to Cuba.

== Taxonomy and systematics ==
The Cuban bullfinch has a complicated taxonomic history. It was formally described by the Swedish naturalist Carl Linnaeus in 1758 in the tenth edition of his Systema Naturae under the binomial name Loxia nigra. Linnaeus based his short description on Mark Catesby's "The Little Black Bullfinch" and Eleazar Albin's "Black Bullfinch ". The type location is Cuba. The specific epithet nigra is Latin meaning "black".

By 1970 the Cuban bullfinch had been assigned to the genus Melopyrrha that had been introduced in 1853 by the French naturalist Charles Lucien Bonaparte. While most taxonomic systems retained it in Melopyrrha, in 2016 BirdLife International's Handbook of the Birds of the World (HBW) moved it to genus Pyrrhulagra. In 2022 it moved it back to Melopyrrha. The Cuban bullfinch is now one of five species in Melopyrrha.

The Cuban bullfinch is monotypic. What is now the Grand Cayman bullfinch (M. taylori) was treated as a subspecies but was recognized as a full species by 2023.

== Description ==
The Cuban bullfinch is 13.8 to 15.0 cm (5.4 to 5.9 in) long and weighs about 12 to 20 g (0.42 to 0.71 oz). The species is sexually dimorphic though not dramatically so. Adult males are glossy black except for white edges on the flight feathers that show as a wide patch on the closed wing; its underwing coverts are also white. Adult females are usually a duller, more grayish black than males and have a smaller wing patch. Both sexes have a dark brown iris, a short, thick black bill, and black legs and feet.

== Distribution and habitat ==
The Cuban bullfinch is found on the main island of Cuba, on Isla de la Juventud (Isle of Pines), and on many small islands in the Sabana-Camagüey and Canarreos archipelagos. It inhabits a wide variety of landscapes including semi-deciduous and evergreen woodlands, pine forest, riparian forest, shrublands, and mangroves. It is found at all elevations.

== Behavior ==
=== Movement ===
The Cuban bullfinch is a sedentary year-round resident.

=== Feeding ===
The Cuban bullfinch feeds on fruits, seeds, flower buds, insects, and nectar. It is known to feed on more than 70 plant species. It forages singly, in pairs, and in family groups, from near the ground to the forest canopy. In winter it sometimes joins mixed species feeding flocks.

=== Breeding ===
Pairs of Cuban bullfinches may form as early as January but breeding spans from March to August. Its nest is a large globe with a side entrance. Both sexes build the nest from a wide variety of plant materials, animal hair, and feathers, and it is typically in a bush or tree within about 2 m (7 ft) of the ground. The clutch is three to five eggs that are greenish white with reddish brown and lilac spots. The female alone incubates, for 13 to 14 days. Fledging occurs 14 to 17 days after hatch.

=== Vocalization ===
The Cuban bullfinch's song is "a prolonged, pleasant, and very melodious soft warbling ti-ti-tisissiiiitssiiiitsiiii-tooee-toeee" and its calls are "a staccato chi-dip and a thin tsee, which is often repeated". Only males sing.

== Status ==
The IUCN has assessed the Cuban bullfinch as Near Threatened. Its population size is not known and is believed to be decreasing. "This species is affected by habitat loss, and fragmentation as well as by trapping for the cage bird market. Forest loss within the species' range is currently estimated at ~2.8% across a ten year period. It is considered "common and widespread". The species occurs in many protected areas. However, it "is among the species most sought after and frequently captured for the cagebird trade...the impact of catches on wild populations (possibly long-term effects on abundance, age and sex ratios, and genetic variability) are unknown, but the species is becoming rare or even absent at localities where it formerly was common".
