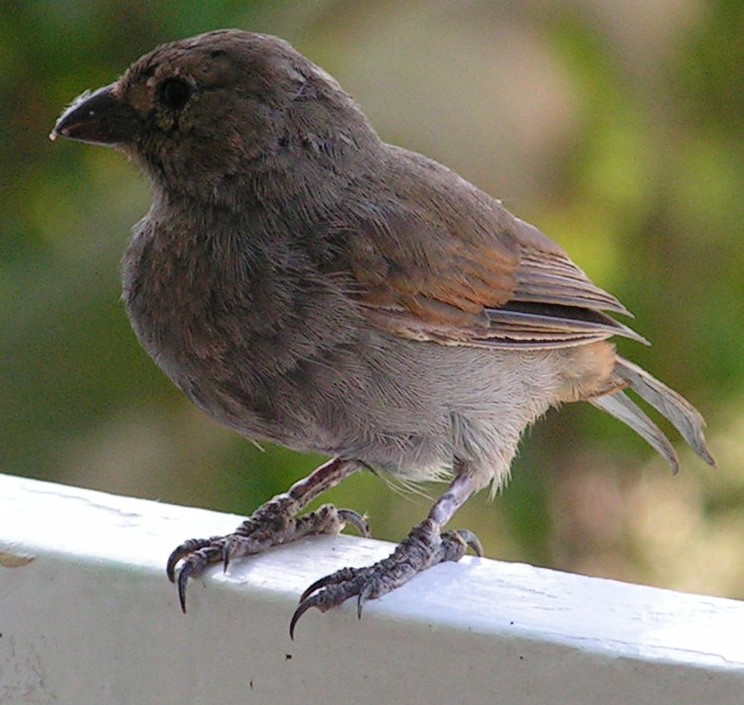

Conservation status
- Least Concern (IUCN 3.1)

Scientific classification
- Kingdom: Animalia
- Phylum: Chordata
- Class: Aves
- Order: Passeriformes
- Family: Thraupidae
- Genus: Loxigilla
- Species: L. barbadensis

Binomial name
- Loxigilla barbadensis Cory, 1886

= Barbados bullfinch =

Species of bird

The Barbados bullfinch (Loxigilla barbadensis) is a seedeater bird that is found only on the Caribbean island-nation of Barbados, where it is the only endemic bird species.

== Taxonomy ==
The Barbados bullfinch was previously considered a subspecies of the Lesser Antillean bullfinch (Loxigilla noctis), which is found on neighboring islands. Despite the misleading nature of its name, the Barbados bullfinch is not a bullfinch at all but a seedeater. The bird is known locally as a Sparrow or Sparky.

== Description ==
The Barbados bullfinch is a small bird, 14–15 cm (5.5–6 in). The upperparts are a dark olive-grey, the wings are mostly brown, underparts are greyish, while the under tail-coverts are tawny. The species is not sexually dimorphic, with females and males having similar plumage. The birds' calls include simple twittering, an occasional harsh petulant note, and a sharp trill .

== Distribution and habitat ==
The Barbados bullfinch is found only on the island of Barbados. The birds' habitat includes shrubbery and forest undergrowth; the species has adapted well to humans, often being found in close proximity to areas of human habitation, such as gardens.

== Reproduction ==
Barbados bullfinches construct a globular nest, with a side entrance, in a tree or shrub. The species lays two to three spotted eggs.

== Behavior ==
Barbados bullfinches are extremely innovative and tame birds. Barbados bullfinches living in urban environments were found to have better problem-solving skills and a better immunocompetence than the ones living in rural areas of Barbados. As for their temperament, urban Barbados bullfinches were found to be bolder but more neophobic than their rural counterparts.

== Gallery ==
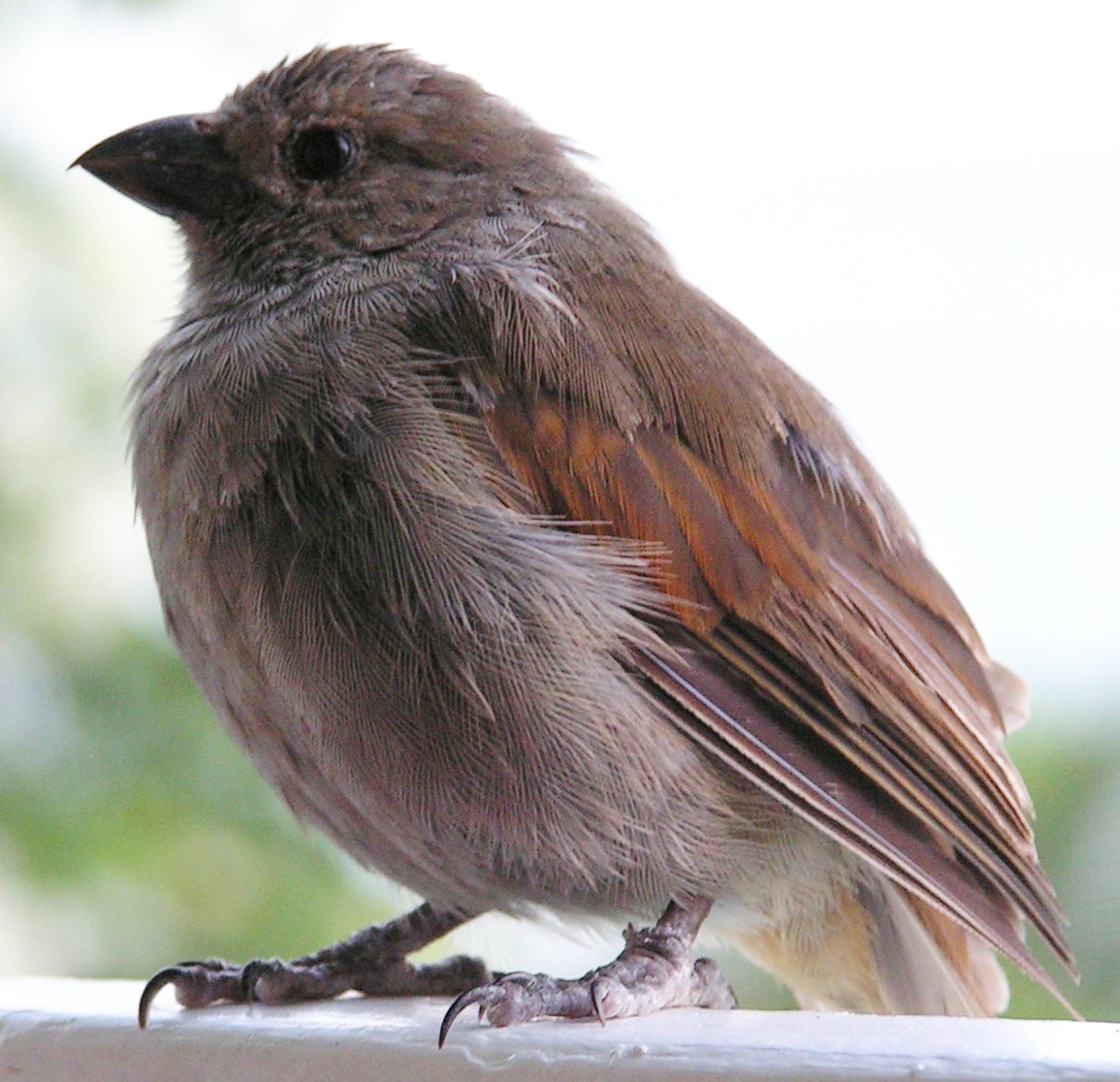

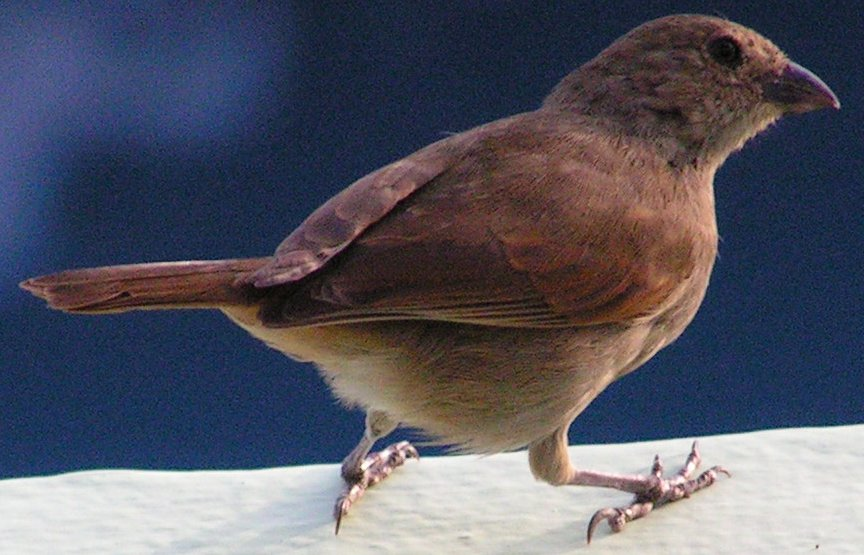

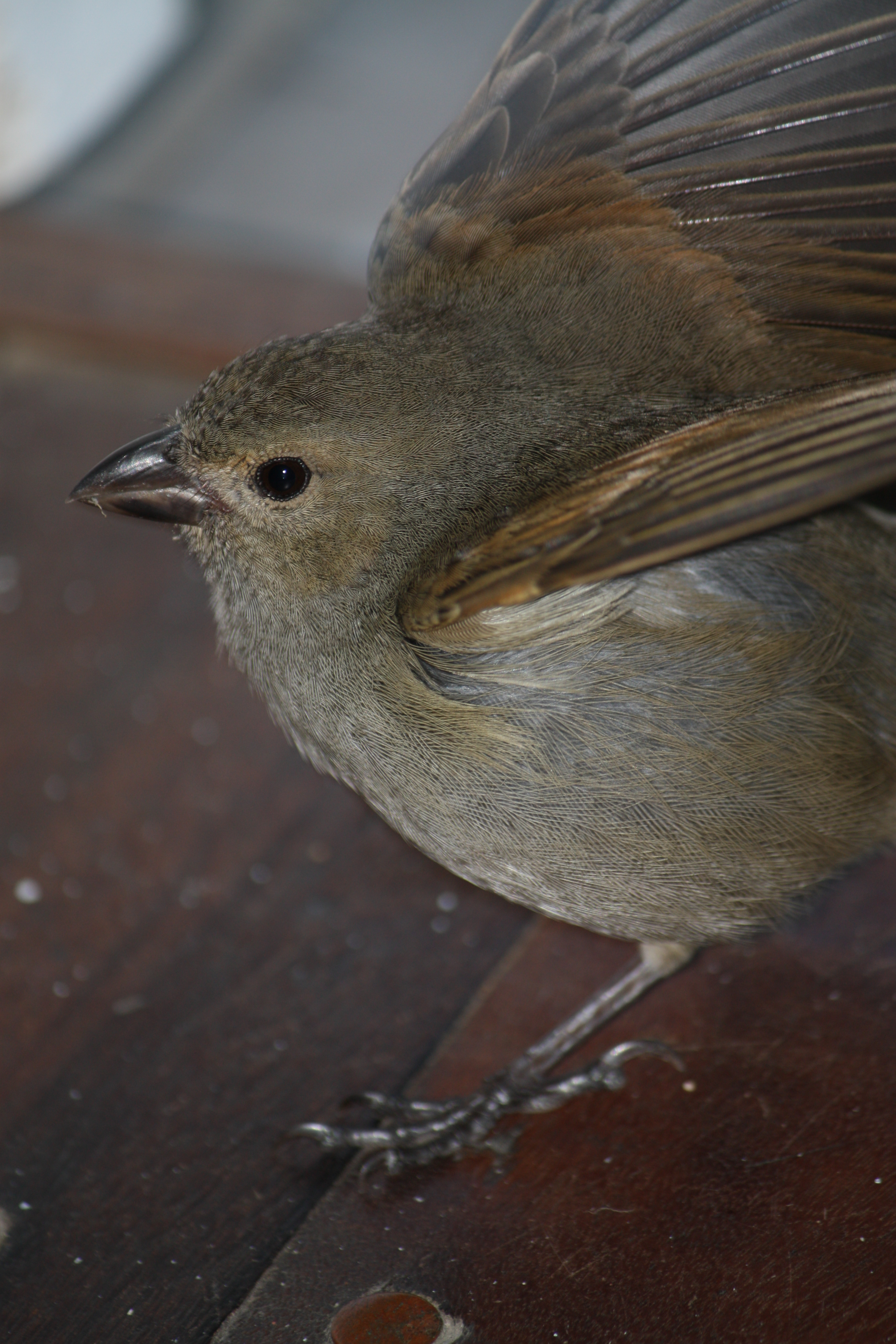
