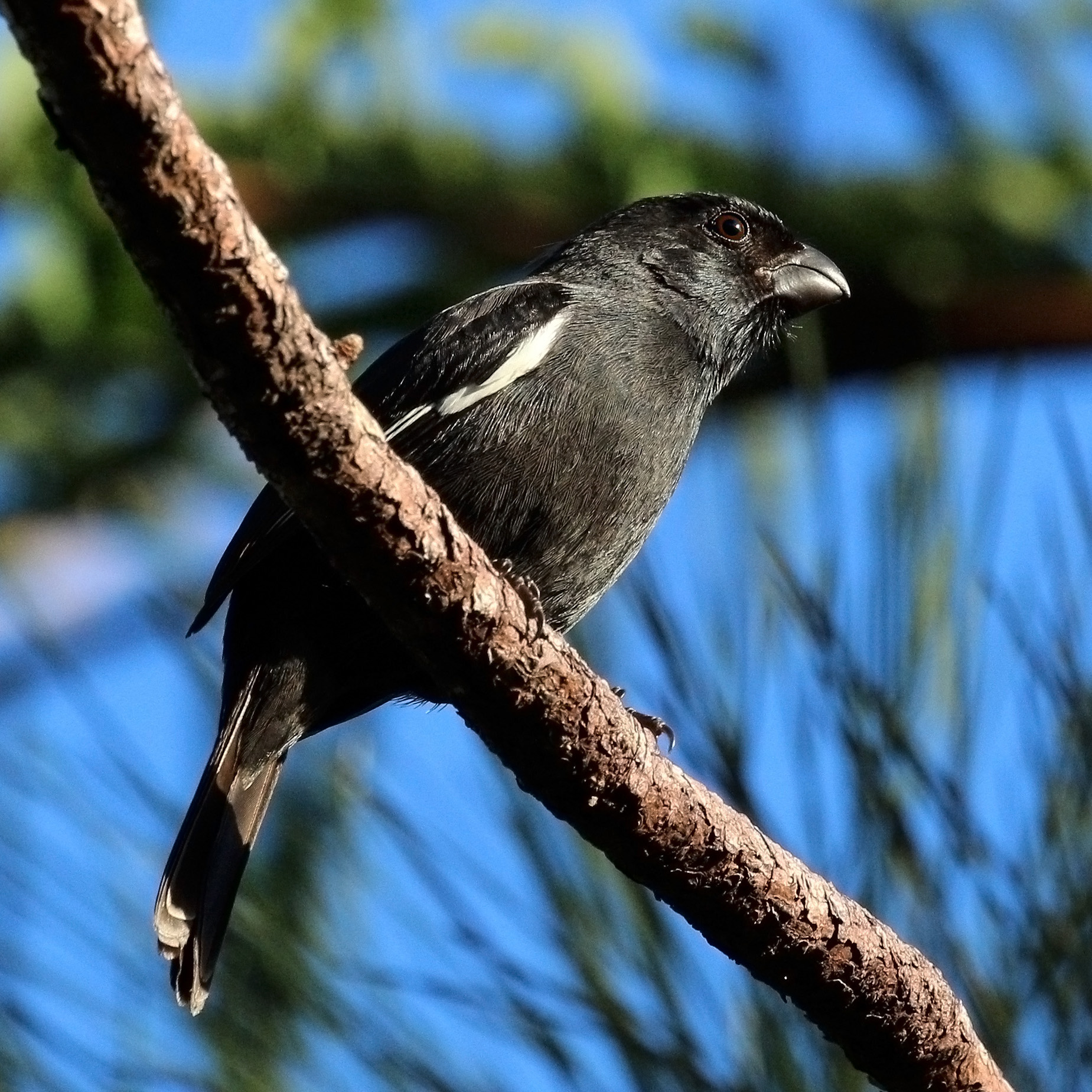
- Cuban bullfinch (Melopyrrha nigra)

Scientific classification
- Kingdom: Animalia
- Phylum: Chordata
- Class: Aves
- Order: Passeriformes
- Family: Thraupidae
- Genus: Melopyrrha; Bonaparte, 1853

Type species
- Loxia nigra Linnaeus, 1758

= Melopyrrha =

Genus of birds

Melopyrrha is a genus of passerine birds in the tanager family Thraupidae. It is made up of four extant species endemic to the Greater Antilles, along with 1 possibly extinct species from the island of Saint Kitts in the Lesser Antilles.

== Taxonomy ==
The genus Melopyrrha was introduced in 1853 by the French naturalist Charles Lucien Bonaparte. The type species was later specified by George Robert Gray as the Cuban bullfinch. The name combines the Ancient Greek melas meaning "black" with the genus Pyrrhula introduced by Mathurin Jacques Brisson for the bullfinches. This genus was formerly monospecific containing only the Cuban bullfinch. A molecular phylogenetic study published in 2014 found that the genus Loxigilla was polyphyletic and that the Greater Antillean bullfinch, Puerto Rican bullfinch and Cuban bullfinch formed a clade. The three species were therefore placed together in Melopyrrha. In 2021, the possibly extinct St. Kitts bullfinch (M. grandis) was split from M. portoricensis as a distinct species.

Although these species were traditionally placed with the buntings and New World sparrows in the family Emberizidae, molecular genetic studies have shown that they are members of the tanager family Thraupidae and belong to the subfamily Coerebinae that also contains Darwin's finches.

== Species ==
The genus contains the following five species:

Image	Common name	Scientific name	Distribution
	Puerto Rican bullfinch	Melopyrrha portoricensis	Puerto Rico.
	St. Kitts bullfinch	Melopyrrha grandis	Saint Kitts.
	Greater Antillean bullfinch	Melopyrrha violacea	Bahamas, Hispaniola (the Dominican Republic and Haiti, as well as surrounding islands), Jamaica, and the Turks and Caicos Islands.
	Grand Cayman bullfinch	Melopyrrha taylori	Grand Cayman, Cayman Islands.
	Cuban bullfinch	Melopyrrha nigra	Cuba.
