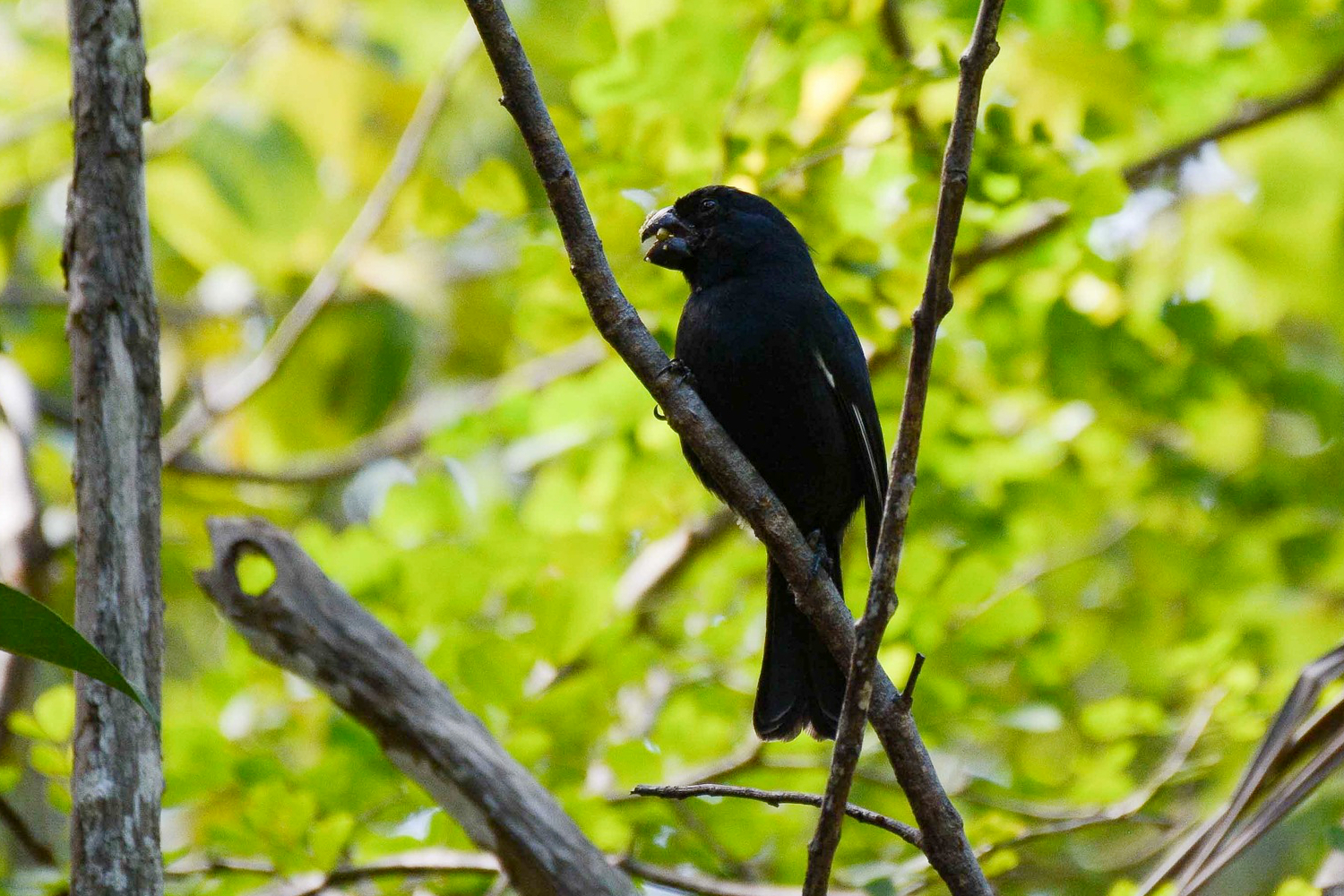
- Male
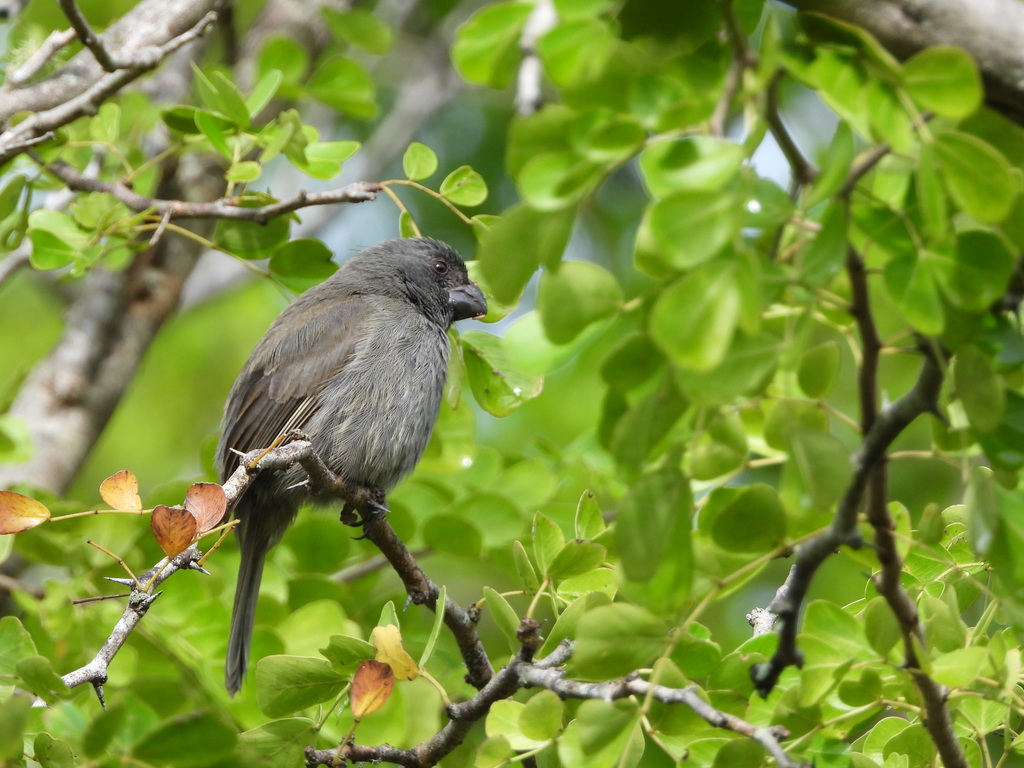
- Female

Conservation status
- Near Threatened (IUCN 3.1)

Scientific classification
- Kingdom: Animalia
- Phylum: Chordata
- Class: Aves
- Order: Passeriformes
- Family: Thraupidae
- Genus: Melopyrrha
- Species: M. taylori

Binomial name
- Melopyrrha taylori Hartert, 1896

Synonyms
- See text

= Grand Cayman bullfinch =

Subspecies of bird

The Grand Cayman bullfinch (Melopyrrha taylori) is a Near Threatened species bird in the family Thraupidae, the tanagers and allies. It is endemic to the island of Grand Cayman. It is the only bird species endemic to the Cayman Islands since the extinction of the Grand Cayman thrush (Turdus ravidus), though several subspecies are also endemic.

== Taxonomy and systematics ==
The Grand Cayman bullfinch has a complicated taxonomic history. It was formally described in 1896 by the German ornithologist Ernst Hartert with its current binomial Melopyrrha taylori. The specific epithet taylori honors Charles B. Taylor of Jamaica who collected the specimens Hartert used in his description. Hartert noted the bird's resemblance to the Cuban bullfinch (M. nigra) and described some differences. He also stated, "I do not think the genus Melopyrrha can be upheld, but I use it for the present, without being able to go critically into the question". By 1960 it had been reassigned as a subspecies of the Cuban bullfinch. In 2016 BirdLife International's Handbook of the Birds of the World (HBW) restored it to full species status but simultaneously reassigned it and the Cuban bullfinch to genus Pyrrhulagra. In 2022 it moved it back to Melopyrrha. Other taxonomic systems retained the Cuban bullfinch in Melopyrrha but did not adopt the split until 2023.

This species is one of five in the genus Melopyrrha that Charles Lucien Bonaparte erected in 1853. The name combines the Ancient Greek melas meaning "black" with the genus Pyrrhula, the bullfinches. (Genus Melopyrrha is not closely related to the Eurasian bullfinches of the genus Pyrrhula, which are true finches, but is in the tanager family Thraupidae.)

The Grand Cayman bullfinch is monotypic.

== Description ==
The Grand Cayman bullfinch is 14 to 15 cm (5.5 to 5.9 in) long and weighs about 16 to 19 g (0.56 to 0.67 oz). The species is sexually dimorphic. It has very robust bill with a markedly curved culmen. Adult males are dull black except for white edges on the flight feathers that show as a wide patch on the closed wing; its underwing coverts are also white. Their tail is dull black with faint whitish tips on the feathers. Adult females have a blackish slate head and upperparts. Their throat, breast, and upper belly are blackish gray and their lower belly and flanks brownish olive-gray. Both sexes have a dark brown iris, a silvery gray bill, and black legs and feet. In contrast, Cuban bullfinches have a black bill. Males are glossy black with less white on the wings and females are overall a grayish black.

== Distribution and habitat ==
The Grand Cayman bullfinch is found only on Grand Cayman. A sighting on Little Cayman attributed to the species is thought "as likely (if not more likely) to have involved the now-split Cuban Bullfinch". It inhabits a wide variety of landscapes including semi-deciduous and evergreen woodlands, pine forest, shrublands, mangroves, and around human habitations.

== Behavior ==
=== Movement ===
The Grand Cayman bullfinch is a sedentary year-round resident.

=== Feeding ===
The Grand Cayman bullfinch feeds on fruits, seeds, flowers, and insects. It usually forages in pairs, from near the ground to the forest canopy.

=== Breeding ===
The Grand Cayman bullfinch begins breeding between January and March; the timing appears tied to the availability of fruit. Its season may last to September. Two styles of nest have been found. One is a ball with a side entrance and the other a cup. The clutch is three or four eggs that are greenish white with reddish-brown spots. Nothing else is known about the species' breeding biology.

=== Vocalization ===
The Grand Cayman bullfinch sings only at the start of the breeding season. The song "begins as a trill zee-zee-zee, falls briefly then rises over 8–30 tssi notes, the longest reaching a very high and barely audible pitch". Its calls are an "insect-like chi-p and zee zee, with the first note high-pitched".

== Status ==
The IUCN has assessed the Grand Cayman bullfinch as Near Threatened. It has a small range; its estimated population of between 10,000 and 20,000 mature individuals is believed to be decreasing. "Habitat fragmentation and invasive mammals, particularly in the west of the island, have been reported to be potential threats". It is most common at North Side, North Sound Estates, and South Sound Swamp. It is almost absent from the western half of the island due to urban development but occurs in two protected areas in the east.
