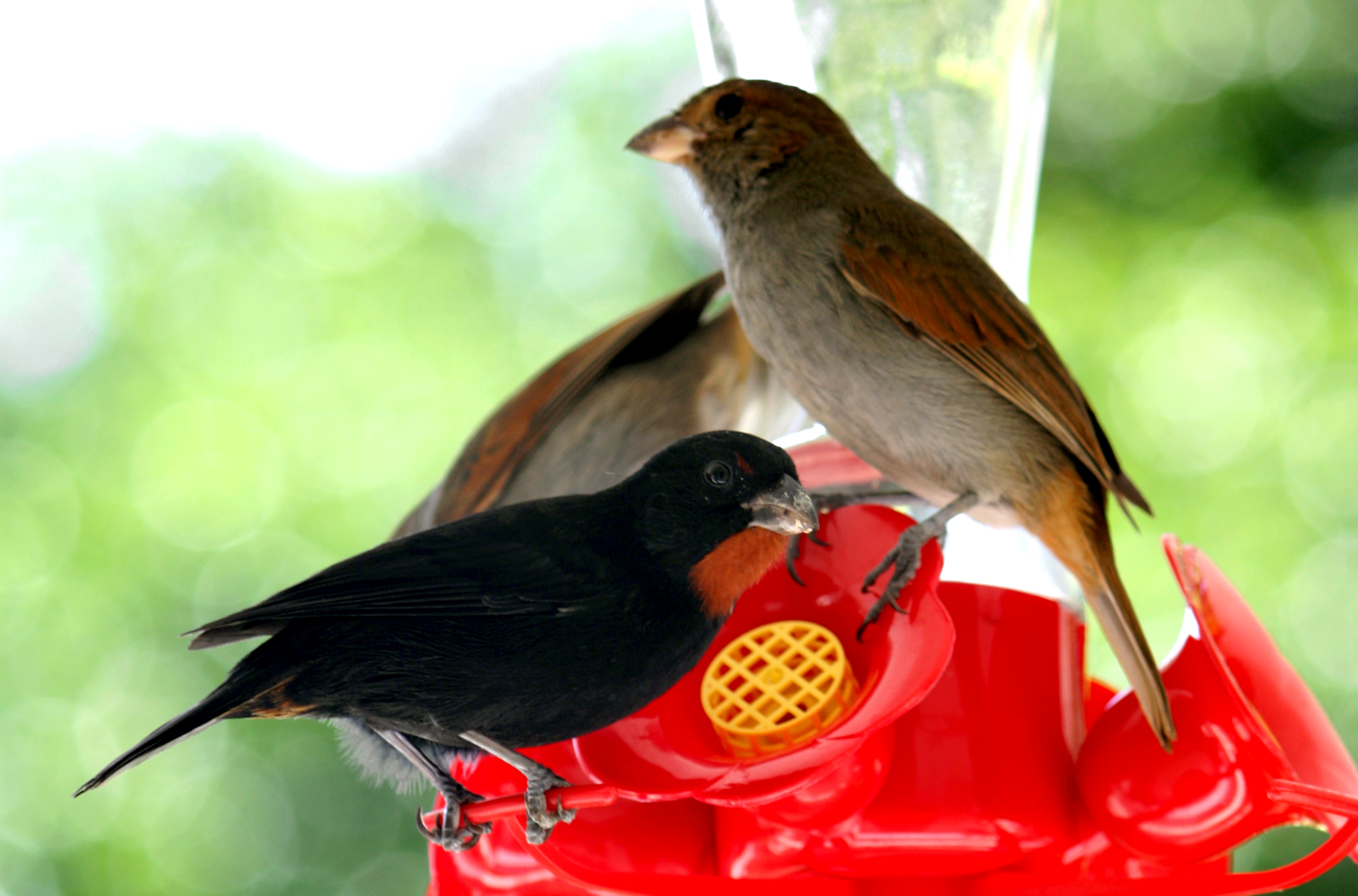
- Male and two females in Dominica

Conservation status
- Least Concern (IUCN 3.1)

Scientific classification
- Kingdom: Animalia
- Phylum: Chordata
- Class: Aves
- Order: Passeriformes
- Family: Thraupidae
- Genus: Loxigilla
- Species: L. noctis

Binomial name
- Loxigilla noctis (Linnaeus, 1766)

Synonyms
- Fringilla noctis (protonym)

= Lesser Antillean bullfinch =

Species of bird

The Lesser Antillean bullfinch (Loxigilla noctis) is a species of bird in the family Thraupidae, the tanagers and allies. It is found along the Lesser Antilles island chain from the Virgin Islands to Grenada.

== Taxonomy and systematics ==
The lesser Antillean bullfinch was formally described by the Swedish naturalist Carl Linnaeus in 1766 in the twelfth edition of his Systema Naturae under the binomial name Fringilla noctis. Linnaeus's description was primarily based on "Le Père Noir" that French zoologist Mathurin Jacques Brisson had described and illustrated in 1760. The specific epithet noctis is from the Latin nox meaning "night". The Lesser Antillean bullfinch is now in the genus Loxigilla that was introduced in 1831 by René Lesson.

The Lesser Antillean bullfinch has these eight subspecies:

- L. n. coryi (Ridgway, 1898)
- L. n. ridgwayi (Cory, 1892)
- L. n. desiradensis Danforth, 1937
- L. n. dominicana (Ridgway, 1898)
- L. n. noctis (Linnaeus, 1766)
- L. n. sclateri Allen, JA, 1880
- L. n. crissalis (Ridgway, 1898)
- L. n. grenadensis (Cory, 1892)

What is now the Barbados bullfinch (L. barbadensis) was previously treated as a ninth subspecies. Beginning in 2006 taxonomic systems elevated it to species level; previously it had been considered as the only non-sexually dimorphic subspecies of the Lesser Antillean bullfinch.

== Description ==
The Lesser Antillean bullfinch is 14 to 15.5 cm (5.5 to 6.1 in) long and weighs 13.1 to 23.4 g (0.46 to 0.83 oz). The species is sexually dimorphic. Adult males of the nominate subspecies L. n. noctis are mostly black with a short red supercilium and an orangish red throat. Adult females have a warm brown head with some rusty on the lores. Their upperparts and tail are also warm brown. Their wings are mostly warm brown with bright rusty edges on the greater coverts. Their underparts are mostly warm gray with rusty undertail coverts.

The other subspecies of the Lesser Antillean bullfinch differ from the nominate and each other thus:

- L. n. crissalis: male has larger rufous throat patch and rufous-chestnut undertail coverts
- L. n. grenadensis: male similar to crisalis with smaller throat patch and some black in the undertail coverts
- L. n. desiradensis: male similar to grenadensis but larger and duller black overall
- L. n. dominicana: male similar to grenadensis but larger and duller black overall
- L. n. ridgwayi: smaller than dominicana; males have grayish black upperparts and slate gray underparts
- L. n. coryi: slightly darker than ridgwayi
- L. n. sclateri: smaller than nominate with shorter red supercilium

Both sexes of all subspecies have a dark brown iris and dark grayish, brown, or black legs and feet. Males have a black or dark brown bill and females usually a blackish maxilla and a brownish or horn mandible.

== Distribution and habitat ==
The Lesser Antillean bullfinch is found on most of the main islands and several smaller ones along the Lesser Antilles. The subspecies are found thus:

- L. n. coryi: northwestern islands of Saba, Sint Eustatius, Saint Kitts and Nevis, and Montserrat
- L. n. ridgwayi: Vieques, Puerto Rico in the Greater Antilles, United States Virgin Islands, British Virgin Islands, and northern Lesser Antilles islands of Anguilla, Antigua and Barbuda, and Saint Martin
- L. n. desiradensis: La Désirade off Grande-Terre, Guadeloupe
- L. n. dominicana: Dominica and Guadeloupe islands of Îles des Saintes, Marie-Galante, Grande-Terre, and Basse-Terre
- L. n. noctis: Martinique
- L. n. sclateri: Saint Lucia
- L. n. crissalis: Saint Vincent but see below
- L. n. grenadensis: Grenada

Most sources say that the species is not found in the Grenadines but there are eBird records on several of them beginning in 1996. Because the Grenadines are between Saint Vincent and Grenada, it is not clear whether these individuals are L. n. crissalis or L. n. grenadensis.

The Lesser Antillean bullfinch's habitat is briefly described as "shrubbery, gardens, thickets, and forest understory at all elevations". Habitats differ along the island chain but overall encompass "[t]ropical evergreen forest, deciduous woodlands, second growth, gardens, and forest understory; sometimes in dry areas and mangrove swamps".

== Behavior ==
=== Movement ===
The Lesser Antillean bullfinch is non-migratory. However, it does make local movements such as between Grande-Terre and La Désirade. Beginning in the 1970s its range also expanded westward through the U. S. Virgin Islands to St. John and beyond to Vieques.

=== Feeding ===
The Lesser Antillean bullfinch feeds primarily on fruits and insects, and also eats seeds, flowers, and nectar. It is found in pairs, small flocks, and as members of mixed-species feeding flocks. It forages mostly in trees; in one study its average height above the ground was 6.6 m (22 ft).

=== Breeding ===
The Lesser Antillean bullfinch's breeding season overall spans from February to August but differs widely among the islands. Both sexes build the nest, a ball or dome with a side entrance. They use twigs, leaves, and other somewhat coarse material for the main structure and line it with finer fibers. Human-made materials like string and paper are also used. The nest is usually on a tree branch or palm up to about 12 m (40 ft) above the ground but often is placed on a human substrate such as a window ledge or on a beam in an abandoned structure. The clutch is two to four eggs that are bluish white with small red or brown flecks. The female alone incubates, but the period is not known. Young fledge 10 to 16 days after hatch and both parents provision nestlings.

=== Vocalization ===
The Lesser Antillean bullfinch "is very vocal and can easily be identified by sound when out of sight". Its vocalizations are described as a "[s]hort, crisp trill; harsh chuk; thin, wiry tseep, tseep; and a lengthy twitter".

== Status ==
The IUCN has assessed the Lesser Antillean bullfinch as being of Least Concern. It has a small range; its population size is not known but is believed to be stable. No immediate threats have been identified. It is considered locally common in the Virgin Islands and common in the rest of the chain. "In a conservation report from 2024 by the BirdsCaribbean’s Endemic and Threatened Species Working Group (ETSWG), drought, climate change, fire, pollution, hurricanes, and invasive species were identified as the top threats to avian species in the region."

== Gallery ==
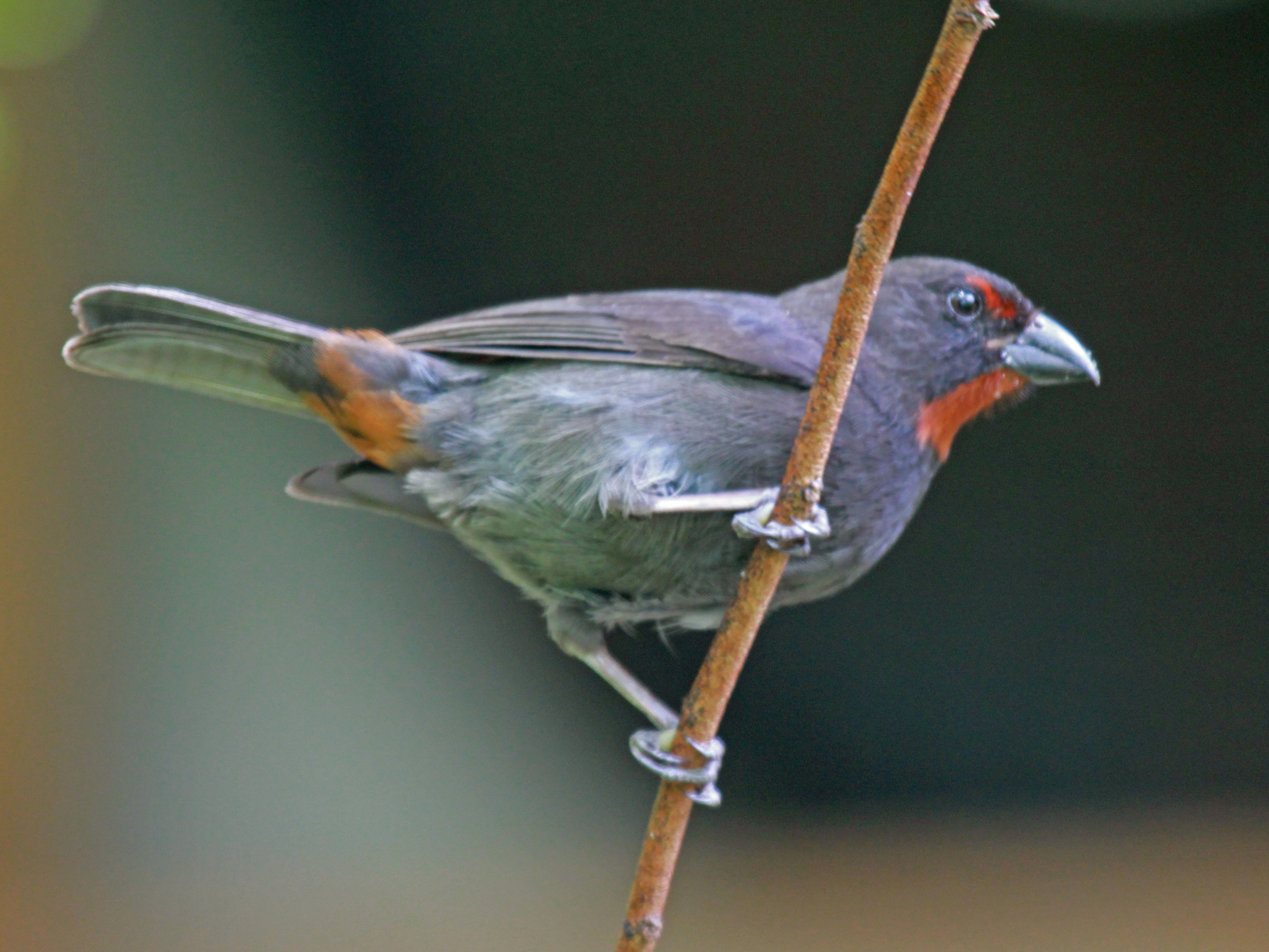
Male on St. John, USVI

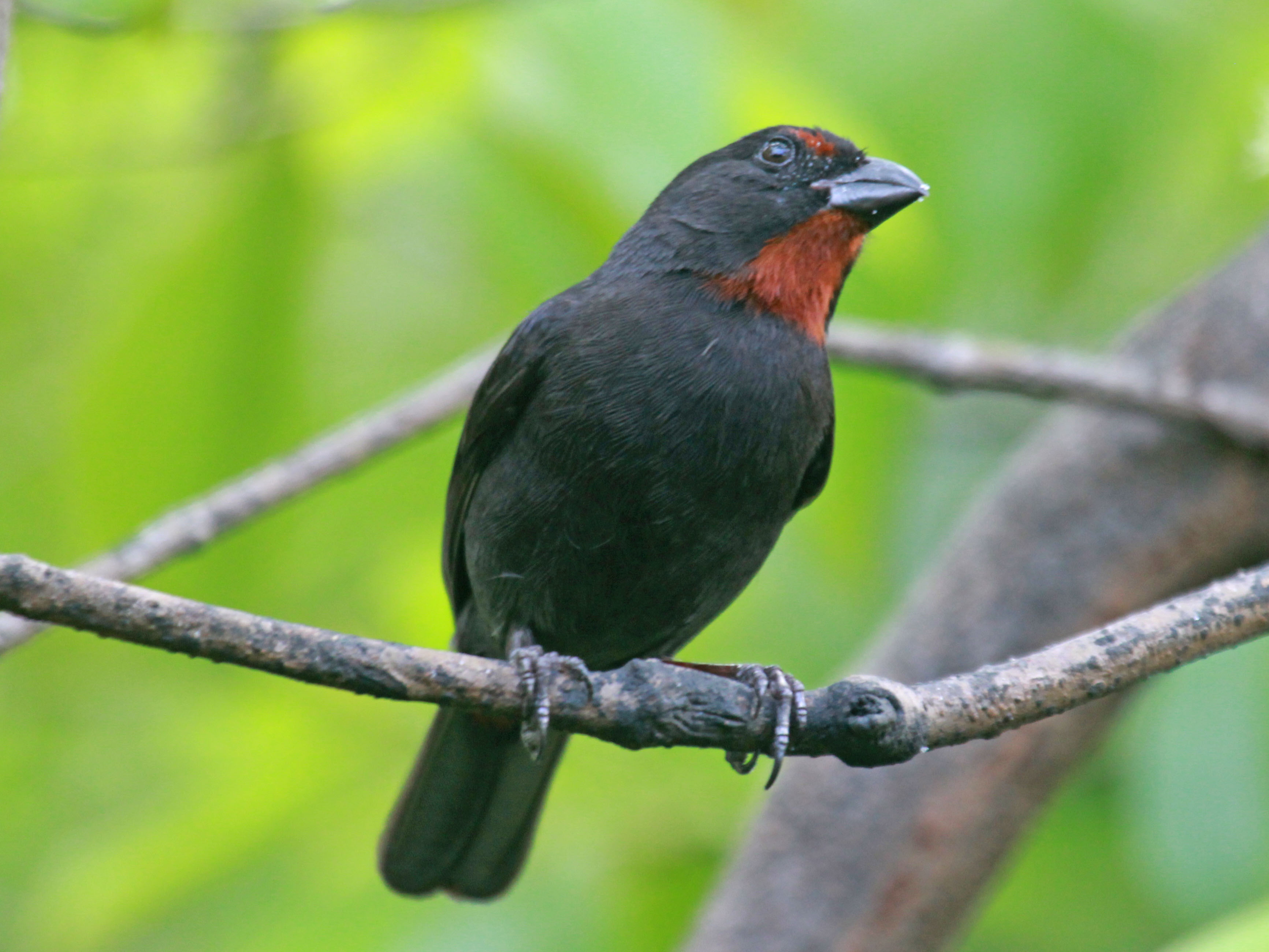
Male on St. John, USVI

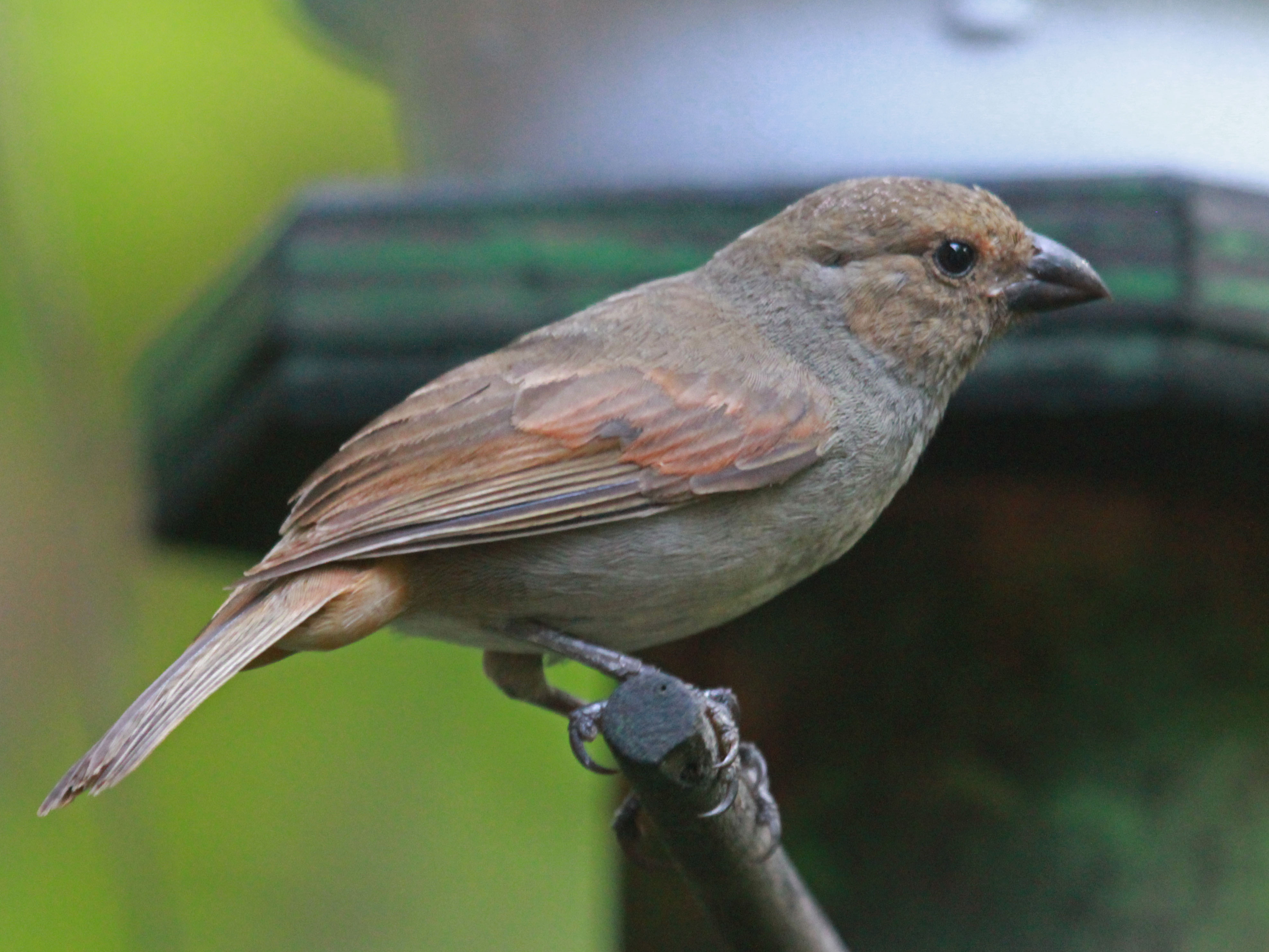
Female on St. John, USVI

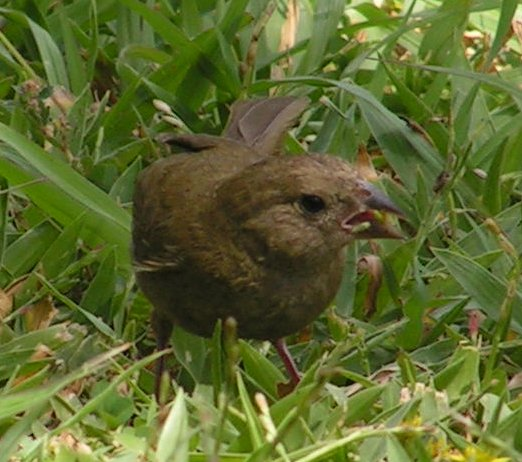
Female in St. Lucia
