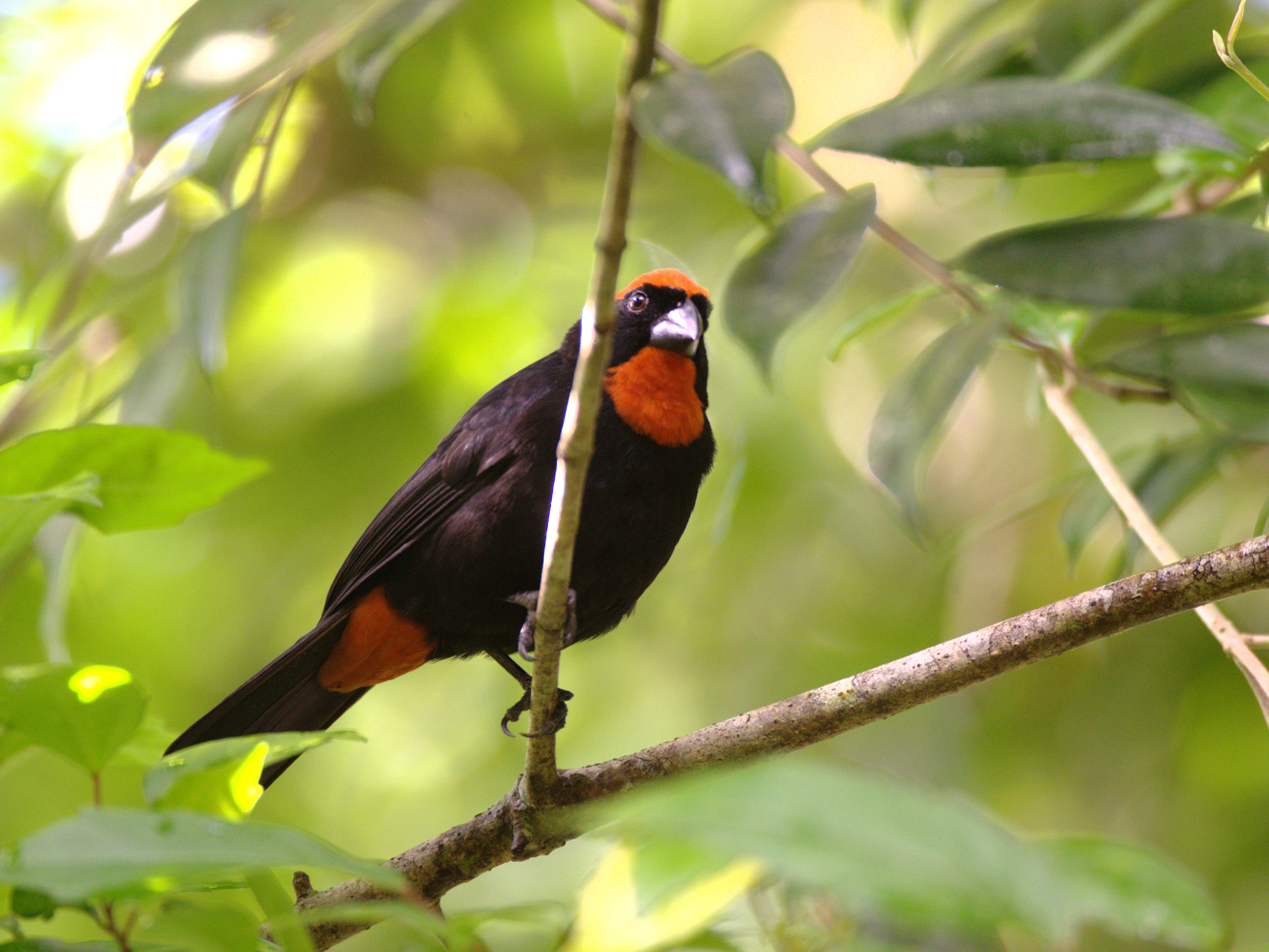

Conservation status
- Vulnerable (IUCN 3.1)

Scientific classification
- Kingdom: Animalia
- Phylum: Chordata
- Class: Aves
- Order: Passeriformes
- Family: Thraupidae
- Genus: Melopyrrha
- Species: M. portoricensis

Binomial name
- Melopyrrha portoricensis (Daudin, 1800)
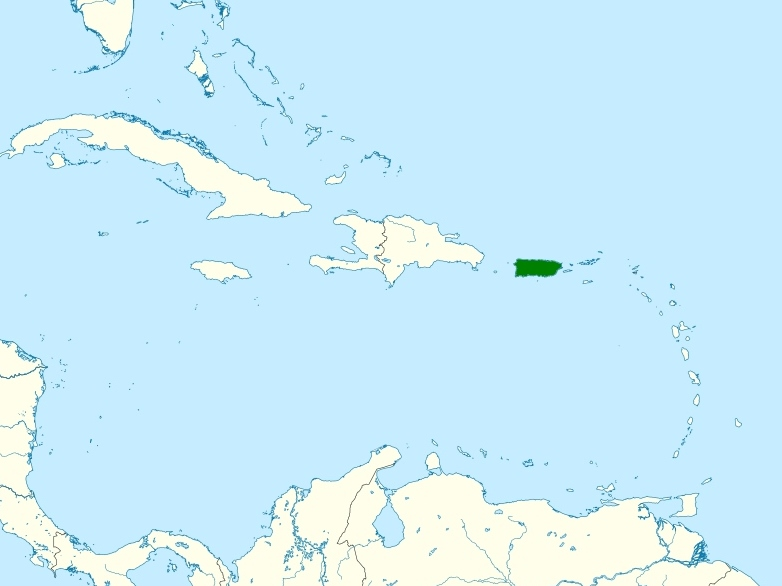

Synonyms
- Pyrrhulagra portoricensis; Loxigilla portoricensis

= Puerto Rican bullfinch =

Species of bird

The Puerto Rican bullfinch (Melopyrrha portoricensis) is a small bullfinch tanager endemic to the archipelago of Puerto Rico. The species can be commonly found in heavy forests throughout Puerto Rico, except on the easternmost tip of the island. It consumes seeds, fruits, insects, and spiders. The nest is spherical, with an entrance on the side. Typically three light green eggs are laid.

== Description ==
The Puerto Rican bullfinch has black feathers with orange areas above the eyes, around its throat, and underneath the tail's base. The species measures from 17 to 19 cm (6.7 to 7.5 in) and weighs approximately 32 grams (1.1 oz).

== Taxonomy ==
The presumably extinct St. Kitts bullfinch (M. grandis), endemic to St. Kitts, was formerly considered a subspecies.

== Diet ==
Bullfinches are considered to be mainly frugivorous (and appear to prefer fruit when available) but they also consume other plant and animal material. Even though the diet of the nestling bullfinches is unknown, most frugivorous bird species feed large quantities of animal matter to their young, especially during the early portion of the nestling stage. In later stages of development, it is likely that the chicks are also fed fruit and insects. Because of their behavioral flexibility when it comes to food consumption, foraging methods, and foraging site preferences, they are considered a generalist species.

== Distribution and habitat ==
Bullfinches are believed to be most common in dense mountain forests but can also be found in lower forests with dense undergrowth, coffee plantations, thick brushy areas, dry coastal thickets, and rarely in mangroves. They have also been described as edge or open-canopy species. Even though it has a widespread distribution over the island, it is suspected that there has been a reduction in range and overall population.

== Breeding ==
It is thought that the main breeding time for the Puerto Rican bullfinch is from March to June within the subtropical moist forest and subtropical wet and lower montane wet forest. Puerto Rican bullfinches seem to nest irregularly throughout the year in the wetter forests of Puerto Rico, where seasonality is much less pronounced. However, in the dry forests of southwestern Puerto Rico, most species restrict their breeding to the spring and early summer rainy season of approximately late April to July. During the dry season from December to April, resources are probably too limiting for birds to successfully rear young in most years. Furthermore, it is hypothesized that bullfinches breed opportunistically in the dry forest as well. Therefore it might be possible that bullfinches and other species attempt to breed again during the shorter annual rainy peak in September and October.

The Puerto Rican bullfinch has been observed exhibiting cooperative breeding behavior in the Guanica region. The observation consisted of juveniles collecting nesting material along with adults and adding material to nests.

This species usually nests close to the ground on trees or shrubs. All species of the genus Melopyrrha, which is endemic to the Caribbean, are described as constructing domed or globular nests and laying clutches of 2–3 dull greenish eggs with dark markings. The bird builds a spherical structure with woven plants materials and sticks. The inner part is usually lined with pieces of bark. There is a side entrance, but the nest may also be domed or totally enclosed with side-opening. It is placed in tree fork, on tree branch or in tree cavity, but also in shrub or clump of grass. From observations, it is thought that the female incubates for 14 days. At hatching, the chicks are naked for 3–4 days, after which the flight-feathers start to grow 10 days later and they fledge 14–15 days after hatching. Their nests are known to be used by frog species, such as the Common coquí.

Nest predation seems to account for most of the nest failures for the species. In the region of Guanica, the pearly-eyed thrasher (Margarops fuscatus) appears to be the most frequent predator. Other possible nest predators include western red-legged thrushes (Turdus ardosiaceus), Puerto Rican racers (Borikenophis portoricensis), anoles (Anolis spp.), small Indian mongooses (Urva auropunctata), green iguanas (Iguana iguana), feral cats (Felis catus) and black rats (Rattus rattus). Nest success is believed to be higher when there is more fruit availability, increased precipitation and decreased nest height.

== See also ==
- Fauna of Puerto Rico
- List of endemic fauna of Puerto Rico
- List of Puerto Rican birds
- List of Vieques birds
- El Toro Wilderness
