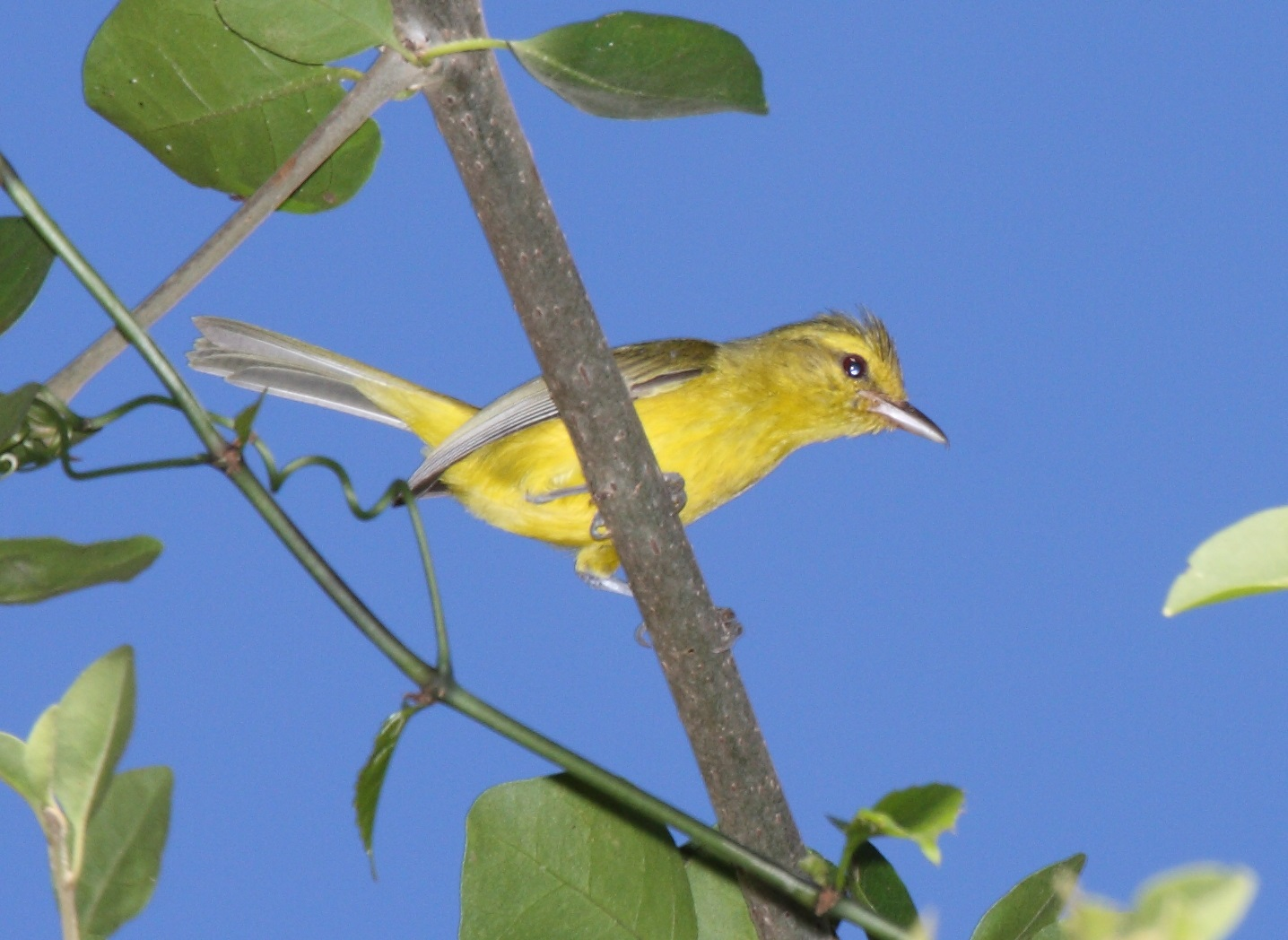

Conservation status
- Least Concern (IUCN 3.1)

Scientific classification
- Kingdom: Animalia
- Phylum: Chordata
- Class: Aves
- Order: Passeriformes
- Family: Vireonidae
- Genus: Vireo
- Species: V. hypochryseus

Binomial name
- Vireo hypochryseus Sclater, PL, 1863

Synonyms
- Pachysylvia hypochrysea

= Golden vireo =

Species of bird

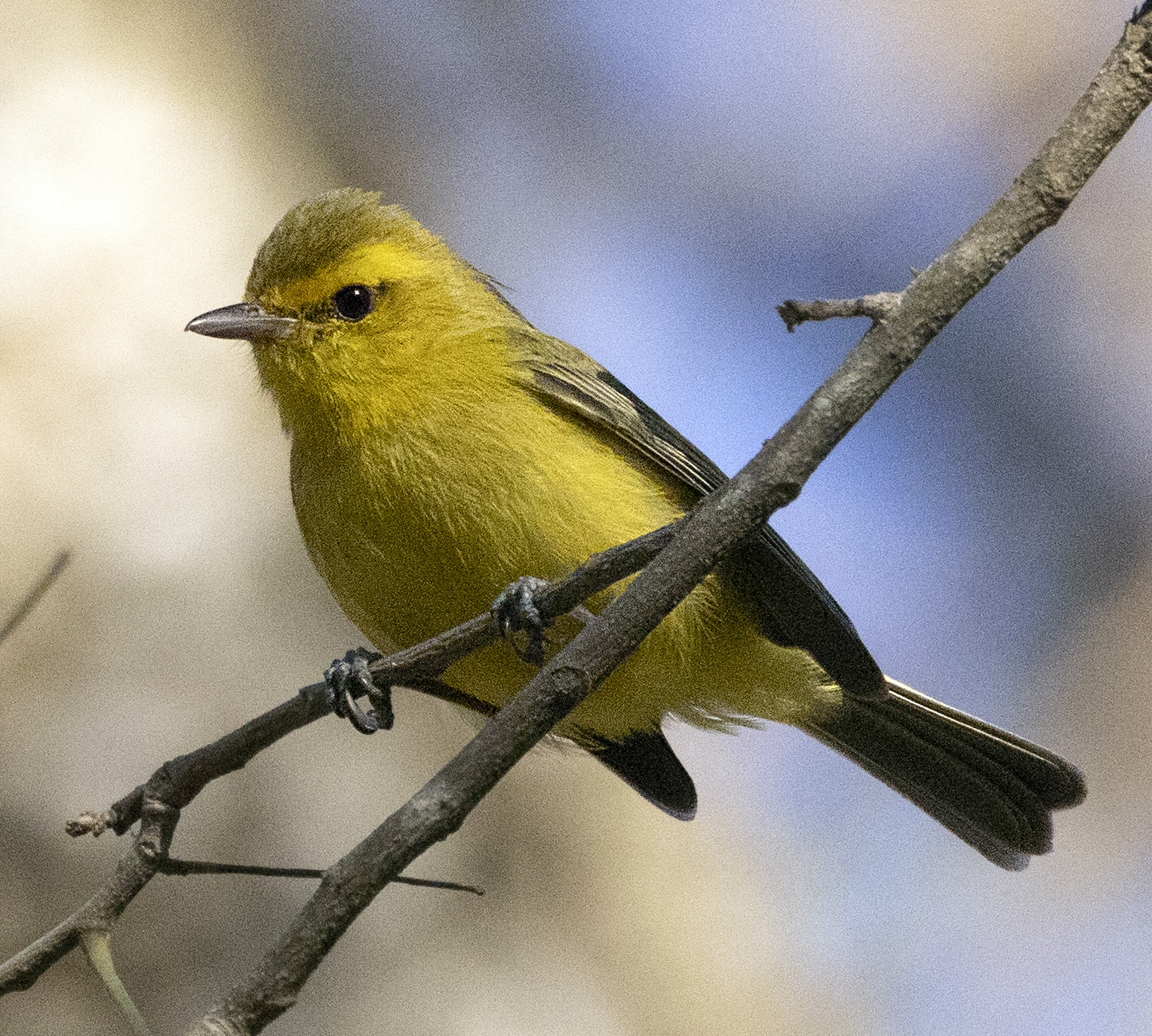
Cabo Corrientes, Jalisco, Mexico

The golden vireo (Vireo hypochryseus), or golden greenlet, is a species of bird in the family Vireonidae, the vireos, greenlets, and shrike-babblers. It is endemic to Mexico.

== Taxonomy and systematics ==
The golden vireo was originally described in 1863 as Vireo hypochryseus, the binomial by which most systems know it.

Its further taxonomy is unresolved. The IOC, the American Ornithological Society, the Clements taxonomy, and AviList retain its original assignment to genus Vireo. However, in 2016 BirdLife International's Handbook of the Birds of the World (HBW) moved it to genus Pachysylvia and renamed it the golden greenlet; as of 2025 it remains there.

All of the systems assign the golden vireo these three subspecies:

- V. h. nitidus (or P. h. nitida) Van Rossem, 1934
- V. h. hypochryseus (or P. h. hypochrysea) Sclater, PL, 1863
- V. h. sordidus (P. h. sordida) Nelson, 1898

== Description ==
The golden vireo is about 12 to 13 cm (4.7 to 5.1 in) long and weighs an average of 12.2 g (0.43 oz). The sexes have the same plumage. Adults have a wide lemon yellow supercilium and streak above the lores with a dark streak through the eye. Their upperparts and tail are yellowish olive-green. Their flight feathers are dark brownish gray with pale yellowish olive edges; by the outer primaries the edges have lightened to pale gray or grayish white. Their underparts are lemon yellow with a pale olive green tinge on the flanks. They have a dark brown iris, a pinkish gray bill, and blue-gray legs and feet. Juveniles have paler underparts than adults and their crown and upperparts have a brown wash. Subspecies V. h. nitidus has brighter yellow underparts than the nominate with little or no olive on the flanks. V. h. sordidus has darker olive-green (less yellowish) upperparts and dingier, more greenish yellow, underparts than the nominate; their bill is dark horn color.

== Distribution and habitat ==
The golden vireo is a bird of western Mexico. The nominate subspecies has by far the largest range of the three. It is found from Sinaloa south to Oaxaca. Subspecies V. h. nitidus is found only in the northwestern state of Sonora. V. h. sordidus is found only on the Tres Marías Islands off Nayarit. The species inhabits deciduous and gallery forest, arid to semi-humid scrublands, and plantations in the tropical zone. Sources differ on its maximum elevation, listing it from 1,000 m (3,300 ft) to 2,000 m (6,600 ft).

== Behavior ==
=== Movement ===
The golden vireo is a year-round resident.

=== Feeding ===
The golden vireo is believed to be mostly insectivorous but to also include some fruit in its diet. It typically forages from the forest's mid-story to its canopy though details of its technique are lacking. It sometimes joins mixed-species feeding flocks.

=== Breeding ===
The golden vireo's breeding season has not been defined but includes June and July. Three nests are known. They were cups made from plant fibers covered with moss or lichens and lined with fine fibers and cattle hair. They were built in branch forks between about 3 and 6 m (10 and 20 ft) above the ground. The species' clutch is three eggs that have reddish streaks and dots. The incubation period, time to fledging, and details of parental care are not known.

=== Vocalization ===
The golden vireo's song is "a rapid series of bright notes, the last usually sharply inflected upwards, whee-whee-whee-wheet or jujujujujeet, at times preceded and followed by a sharp chip, tsik, deeu-deeu-deeu-deeu-deeu-deeu tik". Its calls include "an accelerating, nasal scolding chih cheh-chehchehchehchehcheh, or chih chih chih chechechecheh, etc, a drawn-out scolding shehh, often repeated steadily, [and] a dry chk or chik".

== Status ==
The IUCN follows HBW taxonomy has therefore assessed the "golden greenlet" as being of Least Concern. It has a large range; its estimated population of at least 50,000 mature individuals is believed to be decreasing. No immediate threats have been identified. "Habitat destruction or degradation may jeopardize the viability of populations of Golden Vireo."
