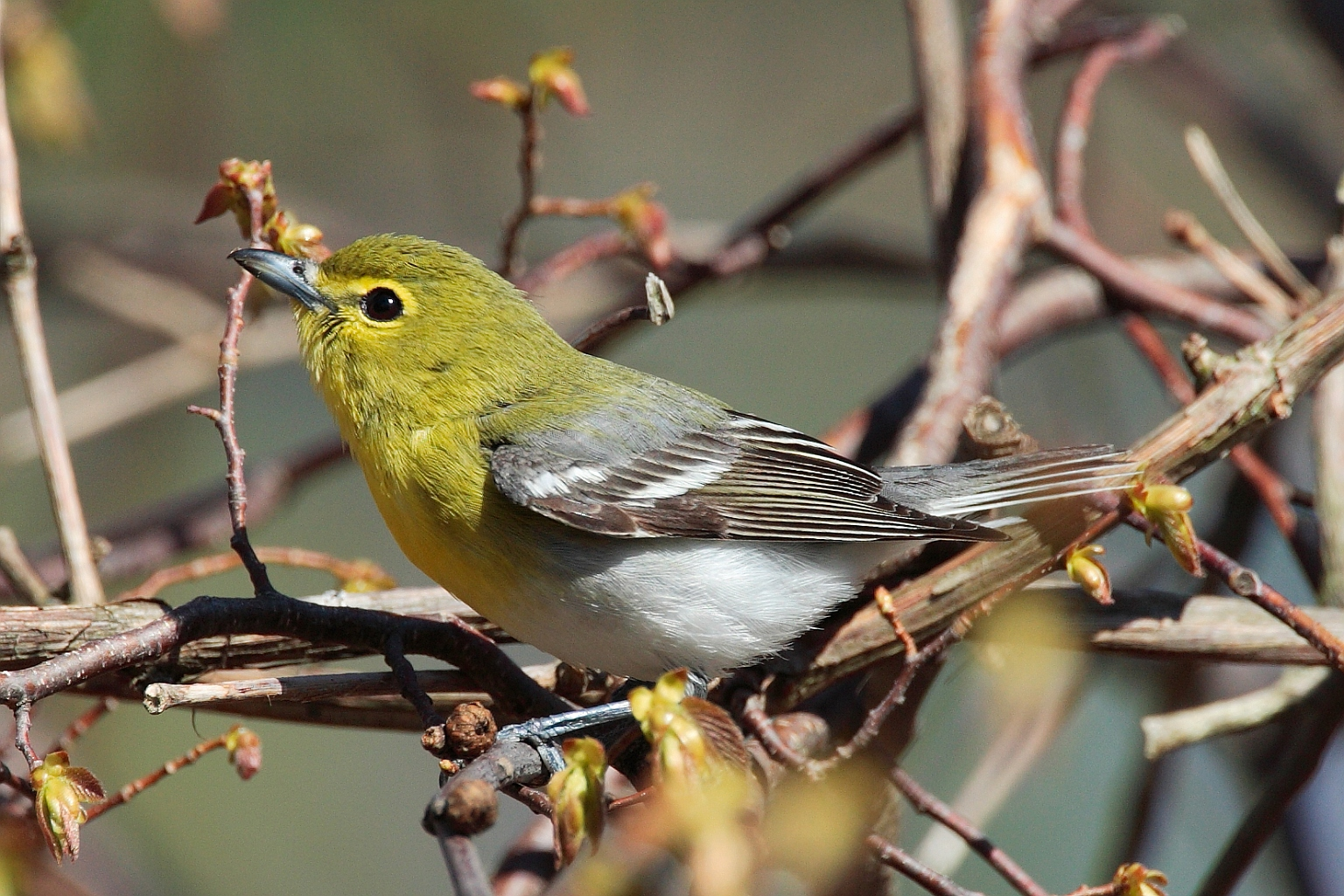
- Yellow-throated vireo (Vireo flavifrons)

Scientific classification
- Kingdom: Animalia
- Phylum: Chordata
- Class: Aves
- Order: Passeriformes
- Superfamily: Orioloidea
- Family: Vireonidae; Swainson, 1837

Genera
- Pteruthius; Erpornis; Cyclarhis; Vireolanius; Hylophilus; Tunchiornis; Pachysylvia; Vireo

= Vireo =

Vireos

Family of birds

The vireos /ˈvɪrioʊz/ make up a family, Vireonidae, of small to medium-sized passerine birds found in the New World (Canada to Argentina, including Bermuda and the West Indies) and Southeast Asia. The family contains 62 species and is divided into eight genera. "Vireo" is a Latin word referring to a green migratory bird, perhaps the female golden oriole, possibly the European greenfinch.

They are typically dull-plumaged and greenish in color, the smaller species resembling wood warblers apart from their heavier bills. They range in size from the Chocó vireo, dwarf vireo, and lesser greenlet, all at around 10 cm (4 in) and 8 g (0.28 oz), to the peppershrikes and shrike-vireos at up to 17 cm (6.7 in) and 40 g (1.4 oz).

== Distribution and habitat ==
Most species are found in Middle America and northern South America. Thirteen species of true vireos occur farther north, in the United States, Bermuda and Canada; of these, all but Hutton's vireo are migratory. Members of the family seldom fly long distances except in migration. They inhabit forest environments, with different species preferring forest canopies, undergrowth, or mangrove swamps.

A few species in the genus Vireo have appeared on the eastern side of the Atlantic as vagrants to the Western Palearctic.

== Behaviour ==
The resident species occur in pairs or family groups that maintain territories all year (except Hutton's vireo, which joins mixed feeding flocks). Most of the migrants defend winter territories against conspecifics. The exceptions are the complex comprising the red-eyed vireo, yellow-green vireo, black-whiskered vireo, and Yucatan vireo, which winter in small, wandering flocks.

=== Voice ===
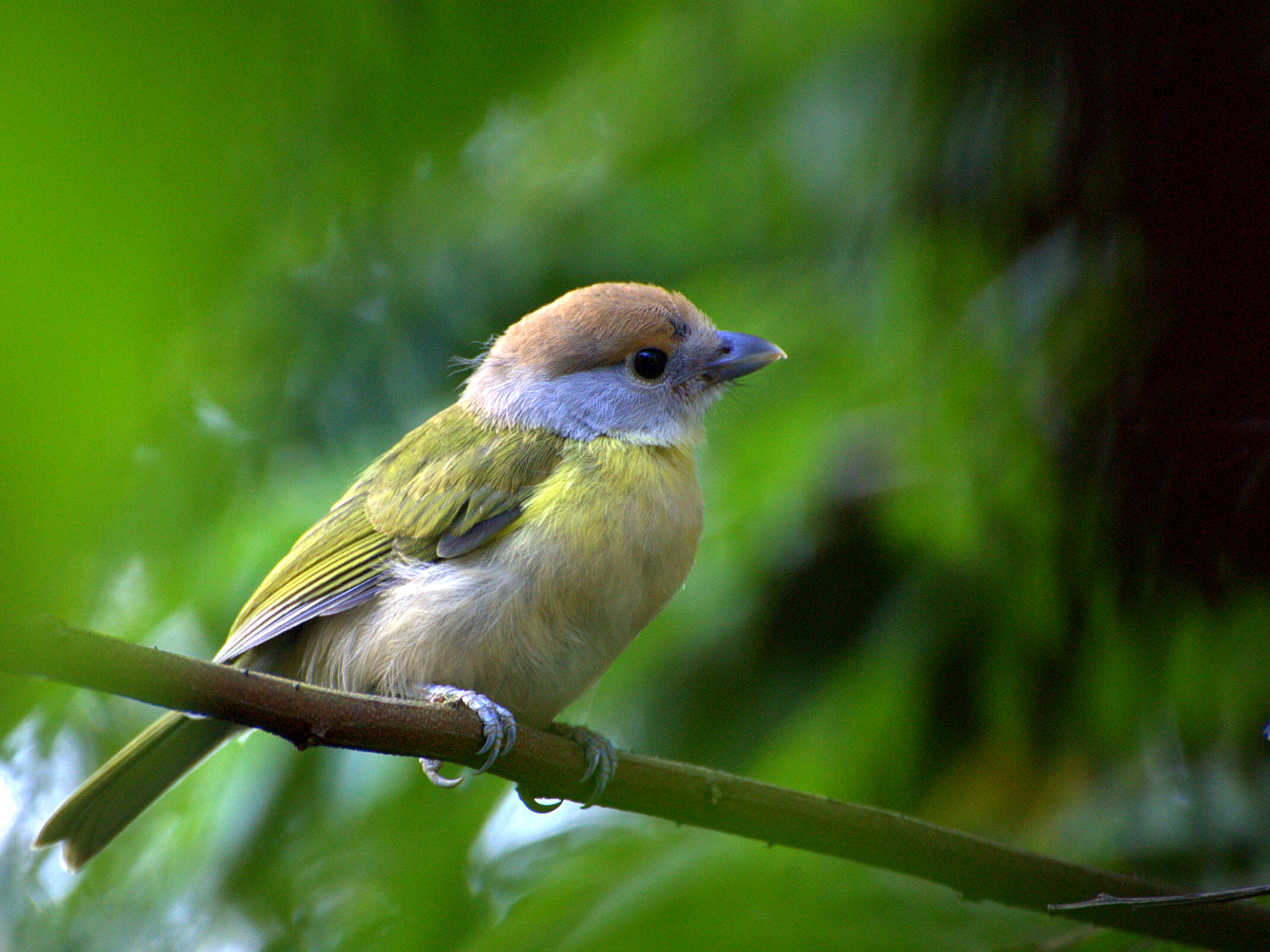
The song of the rufous-browed peppershrike is described as a whistled phrase with the rhythm Do you wash every week?

Males of most species are persistent singers. Songs are usually rather simple, monotonous in some species of the Caribbean littoral and islands, and most elaborate and pleasant to human ears in the Chocó vireo and the peppershrikes.

=== Breeding ===
The nests of many tropical species are unknown. Of those that are known, all build a cup-shaped nest that hangs from branches. The female does most of the incubation, spelled by the male except in the red-eyed vireo complex.

=== Feeding ===
All members of the family eat some fruit, but mostly insects and other arthropods. They take prey from leaves and branches; true vireos also flycatch, and the gray vireo takes 5% of its prey from the ground.

== Systematics ==
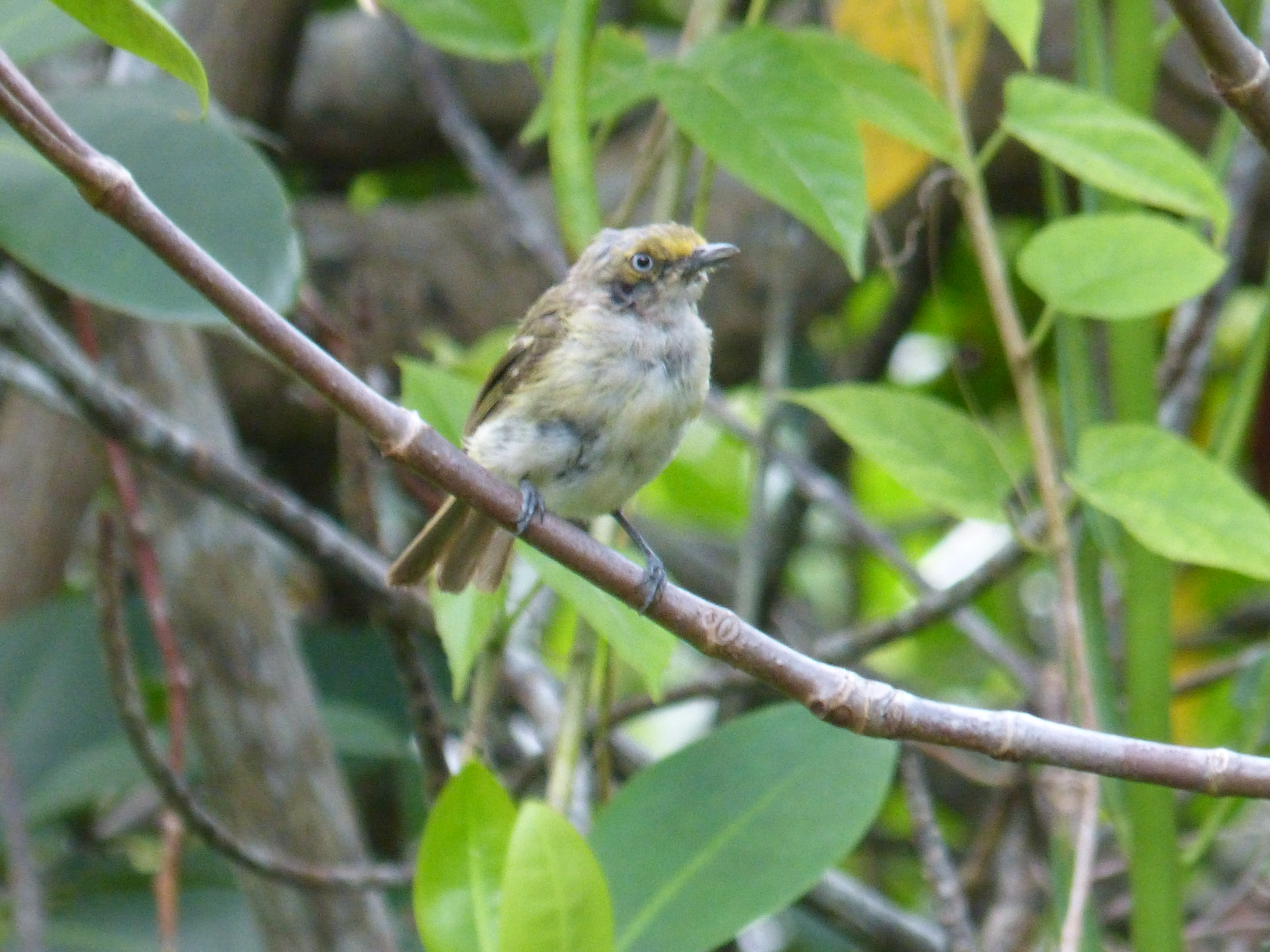
A white-eyed vireo (Vireo griseus bermudianus) in Bermuda

The family Vireonidae is related to the crow-like birds in family Corvidae and the shrikes in family Laniidae as part of superfamily Corvoidea. As currently circumscribed, the family is made up of eight genera.

Traditionally, the family was considered to include four New World genera containing the true vireos (Vireo), the greenlets (Hylophilus), the shrike-vireos (Vireolanius), and the peppershrikes (Cyclarhis). However, phylogenetic studies found Hylophilus to be polyphyletic, with the greenlets split into three distinct groups - the "scrub" greenlets in a restricted Hylophilus, the "canopy" greenlets in resurrected genus Pachysylvia, and the tawny-crowned greenlet in new genus Tunchiornis.

In addition, biochemical studies have identified two babbler genera (Pteruthius and Erpornis), which may be Old World members of this family. Observers have commented on the vireo-like behaviour of the Pteruthius shrike-babblers, but apparently no one suspected the biogeographically unlikely possibility of vireo relatives in Asia. Some recent taxonomic treatements, such as the IOC taxonomy followed here, include Pteruthius and Erpornis in the Vireionidae, whereas others place them in their own families Pteruthidae and Erpornidae.

=== Species in taxonomic order ===
Image	Genus	Species
	Pteruthius - shrike-babblers Swainson, 1832	Green shrike-babbler, Pteruthius xanthochlorus; Black-eared shrike-babbler, Pteruthius melanotis; Black-headed shrike-babbler, Pteruthius rufiventer; White-browed shrike-babbler, Pteruthius aeralatus; Pied shrike-babbler, Pteruthius flaviscapis; Clicking shrike-babbler, Pteruthius intermedius; Trilling shrike-babbler, Pteruthius aenobarbus
	Erpornis Hodgson, 1844	White-bellied erpornis or white-bellied "yuhina", Erpornis zantholeuca
	Cyclarhis Swainson, 1824, the peppershrikes	Rufous-browed peppershrike, Cyclarhis gujanensis; Black-billed peppershrike Cyclarhis nigrirostris
	Vireolanius Bonaparte, 1850, the shrike-vireos	Chestnut-sided shrike-vireo, Vireolanius melitophrys; Green shrike-vireo, Vireolanius pulchellus; Yellow-browed shrike-vireo, Vireolanius eximius; Slaty-capped shrike-vireo, Vireolanius leucotis
	Hylophilus Temminck, 1822	Grey-eyed greenlet, Hylophilus amaurocephalus; Rufous-crowned greenlet, Hylophilus poicilotis; Olivaceous greenlet, Hylophilus olivaceus; Ashy-headed greenlet, Hylophilus pectoralis; Brown-headed greenlet, Hylophilus brunneiceps; Lemon-chested greenlet, Hylophilus thoracicus; Scrub greenlet, Hylophilus flavipes; Grey-chested greenlet, Hylophilus semicinereus
	Tunchiornis Slager & Klicka, 2014	Ochre-crowned brownlet, Tunchiornis ochraceiceps; Rufous-fronted brownlet, Tunchiornis ferrugineifrons; Guianan brownlet, Tunchiornis luteifrons; Para brownlet, Tunchiornis rubrifrons
	Pachysylvia Bonaparte, 1850	Lesser greenlet, Pachysylvia decurtata; Dusky-capped greenlet, Pachysylvia hypoxantha; Buff-cheeked greenlet, Pachysylvia muscicapina; Golden-fronted greenlet, Pachysylvia aurantiifrons; Rufous-naped greenlet, Pachysylvia semibrunnea
	Vireo Vieillot, 1808, the true vireos.	The "hypochryseus" group; Golden vireo, Vireo hypochryseus; The "olivaceous" group.; Yellow-green vireo, Vireo flavoviridis (sometimes included in V. olivaceus); Red-eyed vireo, Vireo olivaceus; Yucatan vireo, Vireo magister; Black-whiskered vireo, Vireo altiloquus; Chivi vireo, Vireo chivi; Noronha vireo, Vireo gracilirostris; The "gilvus" group.; Tepui vireo, Vireo sclateri; Philadelphia vireo, Vireo philadelphicus; Warbling vireo, Vireo gilvus; Brown-capped vireo, Vireo leucophrys; The "eye-ringed" group.; Hutton's vireo, Vireo huttoni; Gray vireo, Vireo vicinior; Yellow-throated vireo, Vireo flavifrons; Yellow-winged vireo, Vireo carmioli; Choco vireo, Vireo masteri; Blue-headed vireo, Vireo solitarius; Cassin's vireo, Vireo cassinii; Plumbeous vireo, Vireo plumbeus; Blue Mountain vireo, Vireo osburni; Flat-billed vireo, Vireo nanus; Mangrove vireo, Vireo pallens; Providencia vireo, Vireo approximans; Cozumel vireo, Vireo bairdi; San Andres vireo, Vireo caribaeus; White-eyed vireo, Vireo griseus; Thick-billed vireo, Vireo crassirostris; Jamaican vireo, Vireo modestus; Cuban vireo, Vireo gundlachii; Bell's vireo, Vireo bellii; Puerto Rican vireo, Vireo latimeri; Black-capped vireo, Vireo atricapilla; Dwarf vireo, Vireo nelsoni; Slaty vireo, Vireo brevipennis
