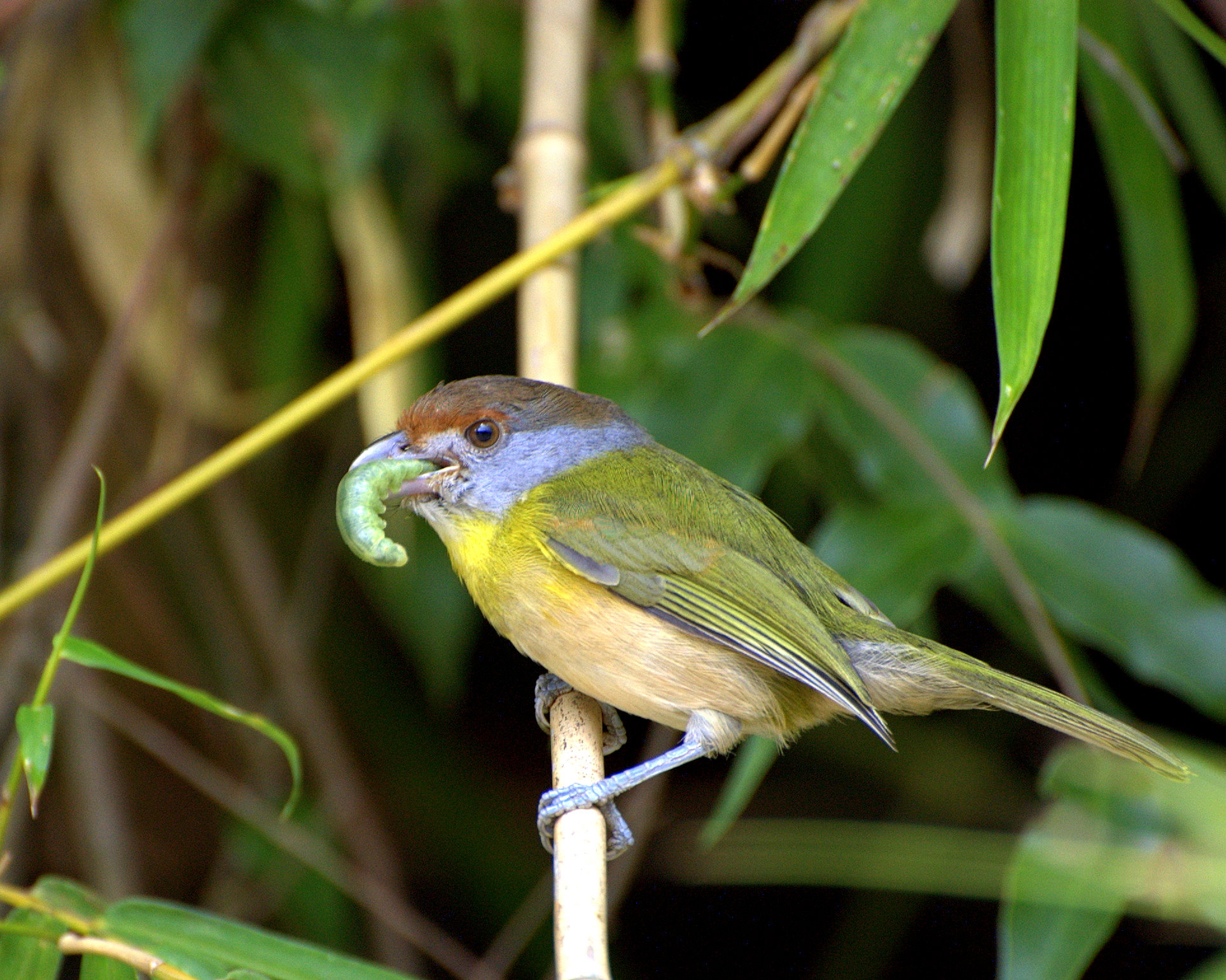
- C. g. ochrocephala feeding on a larva in São Paulo, Brazil

Conservation status
- Least Concern (IUCN 3.1)

Scientific classification
- Kingdom: Animalia
- Phylum: Chordata
- Class: Aves
- Order: Passeriformes
- Family: Vireonidae
- Genus: Cyclarhis
- Species: C. gujanensis

Binomial name
- Cyclarhis gujanensis (Gmelin, JF, 1789)

Synonyms
- Tanagra gujanensis (protonym)

= Rufous-browed peppershrike =

Species of bird

The rufous-browed peppershrike (Cyclarhis gujanensis) is a passerine bird in the vireo family. It is widespread and often common in woodland, forest edge, and cultivation with some tall trees from Mexico and Trinidad south to Argentina and Uruguay.

== Taxonomy ==
The rufous-browed peppershrike was formally described in 1789 by the German naturalist Johann Friedrich Gmelin in his revised and expanded edition of Carl Linnaeus's Systema Naturae. He placed it in the genus Tanagra and coined the binomial name Tanagra gujanensis. The specific epithet is derived from the type locality, the Guianas. Gmelin based his account on "Le verderoux" from French Guiana that had been described in 1778 by the French polymath Comte de Buffon in his multivolume Histoire Naturelle des Oiseaux. The rufous-browed peppershrike is now placed with the black-billed peppershrike in the genus Cyclarhis that was introduced in 1824 by William Swainson.

Twenty two subspecies are recognised:

- C. g. septentrionalis Phillips, AR, 1991 – east Mexico
- C. g. flaviventris Lafresnaye, 1842 – southeast Mexico (except Yucatán Peninsula), Guatemala and north Honduras
- C. g. yucatanensis Ridgway, 1887 – Yucatán Peninsula (southeast Mexico)
- C. g. insularis Ridgway, 1885 – Cozumel (off southeast Mexico)
- C. g. nicaraguae Miller, W & Griscom, 1925 – south Mexico to Nicaragua
- C. g. subflavescens Cabanis, 1861 – Costa Rica and west Panama
- C. g. perrygoi Wetmore, 1950 – central west Panama
- C. g. flavens Wetmore, 1950 – east Panama
- C. g. coibae Hartert, EJO, 1901 – Coiba (off southwest Panama)
- C. g. cantica Bangs, 1898 – north, central Colombia
- C. g. flavipectus Sclater, PL, 1859 – northeast Venezuela and Trinidad
- C. g. parva Chapman, 1917 – northeast Colombia and north Venezuela
- C. g. gujanensis (Gmelin, JF, 1789) – east Colombia and south Venezuela through the Guianas to northeast, central Brazil and east Peru
- C. g. cearensis Baird, SF, 1866 – east Brazil
- C. g. ochrocephala Tschudi, 1845 – southeast Brazil, Uruguay, Paraguay and northeast Argentina
- C. g. viridis (Vieillot, 1822) – Paraguay and north Argentina
- C. g. virenticeps Sclater, PL, 1860 – west Ecuador and northwest Peru
- C. g. contrerasi Taczanowski, 1879 – southeast Ecuador and north Peru
- C. g. saturata Zimmer, JT, 1925 – central Peru
- C. g. pax Bond, J & Meyer de Schauensee, 1942 – central east Bolivia
- C. g. dorsalis Zimmer, JT, 1942 – central Bolivia
- C. g. tarijae Bond, J & Meyer de Schauensee, 1942 – southeast Bolivia and northwest Argentina

== Description ==
The adult rufous-browed peppershrike is approximately 15 cm (5.9 in) long and weighs 28 g (0.99 oz). It is bull-headed with a thick, somewhat shrike-like bill, which typically is blackish below and pinkish-grey above. The head is grey with a strong rufous eyebrow. The crown is often tinged with brown. The upperparts are green, and the yellow throat and breast shade into a white belly. The subspecies ochrocephala from the south-eastern part of its range has a shorter rufous eyebrow and a brown-tinged crown, while the subspecies virenticeps, contrerasi and saturata from north-western Peru and western Ecuador have greenish-yellow (not grey, as in the "typical" subspecies) nape, auriculars and cheeks.

The song is a whistled phrase with the rhythm "Do you wash every week?", but there are extensive variations depending on both individual and range. It is often heard but hard to see as it feeds on insects and spiders high in the foliage, though it has been observed to take small lizards as well.

== Behaviour and ecology ==
The nest is a flimsy cup high in a tree with a typical clutch of two or three pinkish-white eggs lightly blotched with brown. Like most vireos, the peppershrike ejects parasitic cowbird eggs.

The song of the rufous-browed peppershrike.

== Image gallery ==
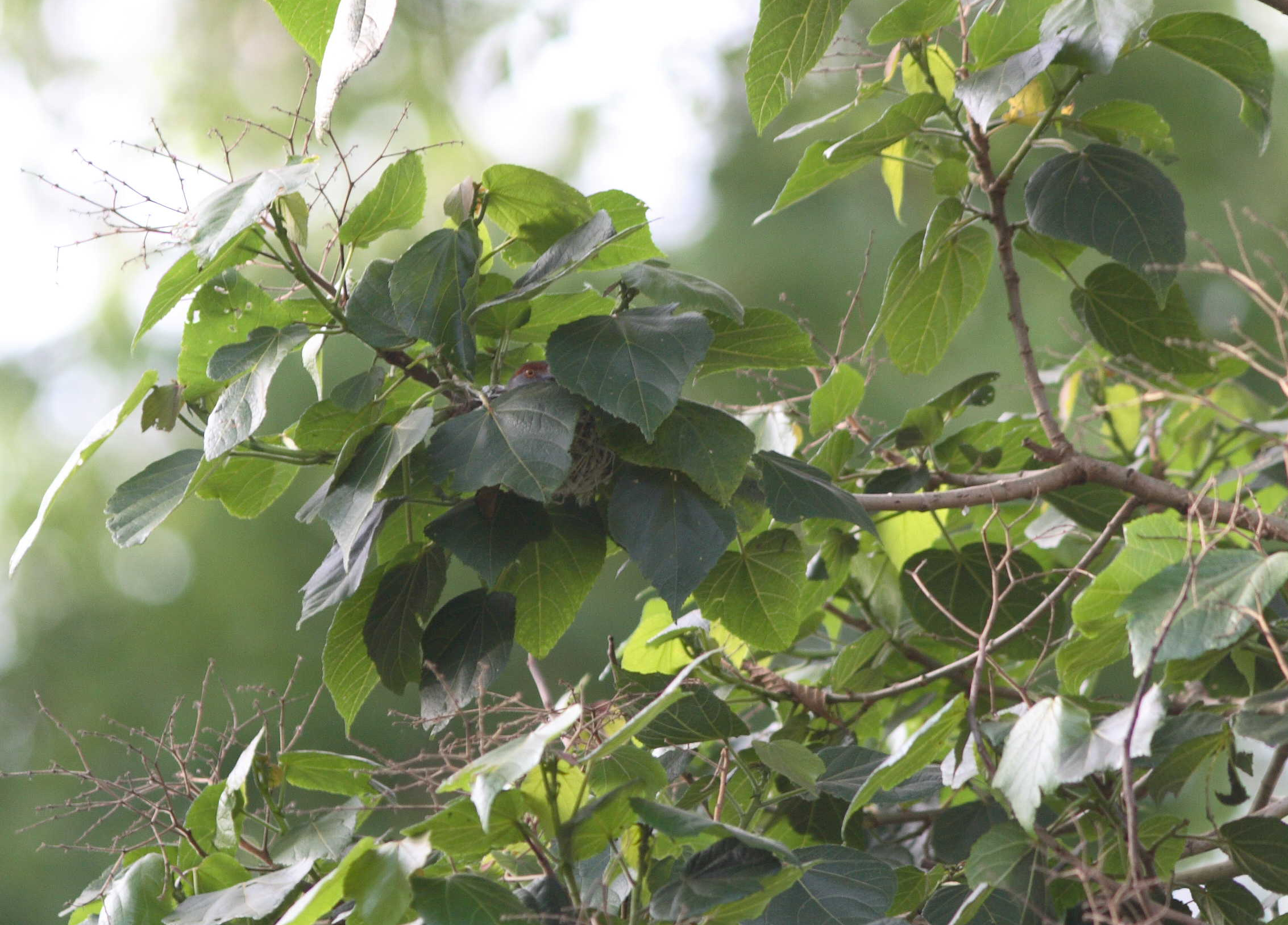
A bird on its nest, 10 m above a stream near El Copey de Dota, Costa Rica, illustrating how cryptic the nests can be.

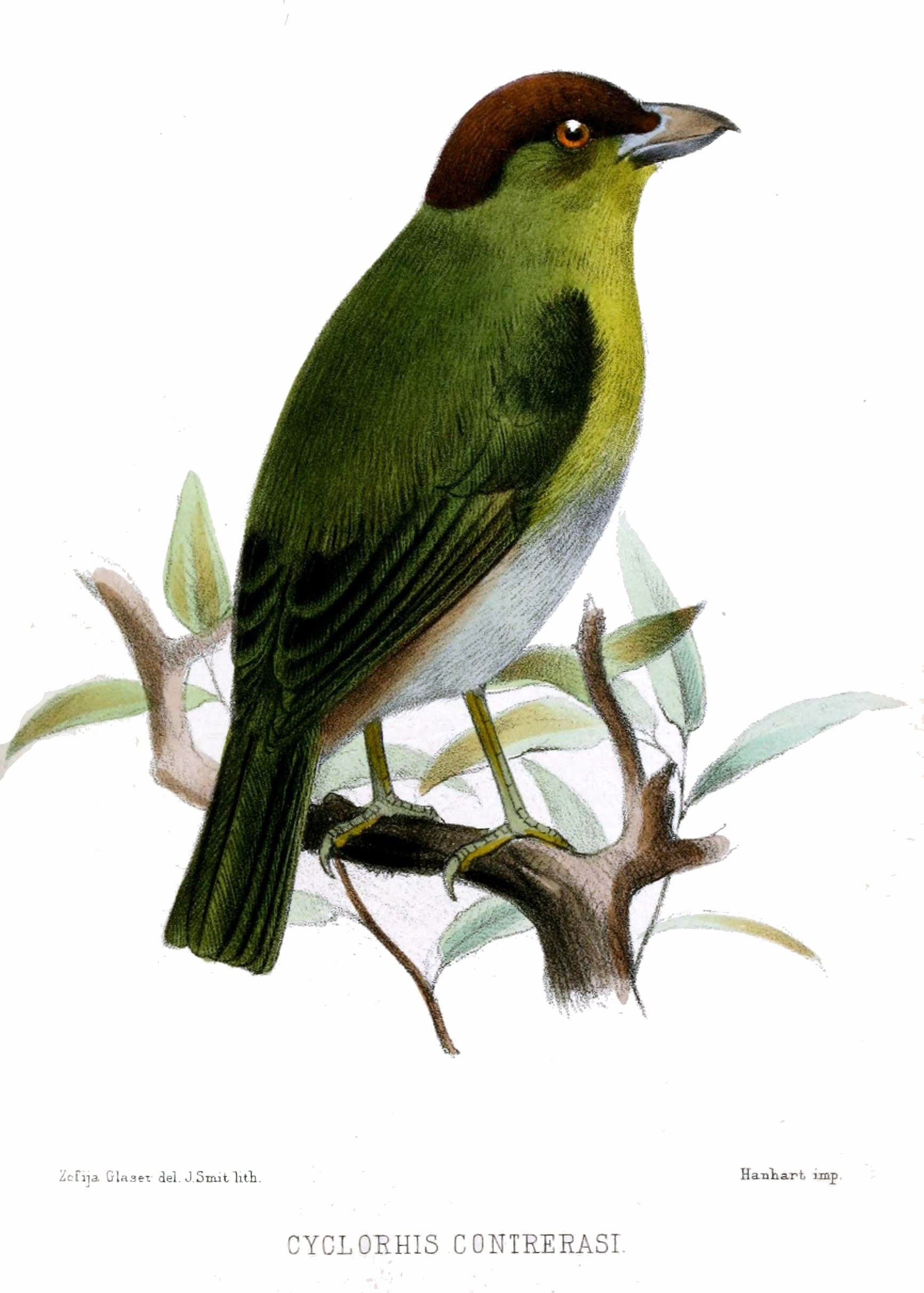
Illustration of C. g. contrerasi

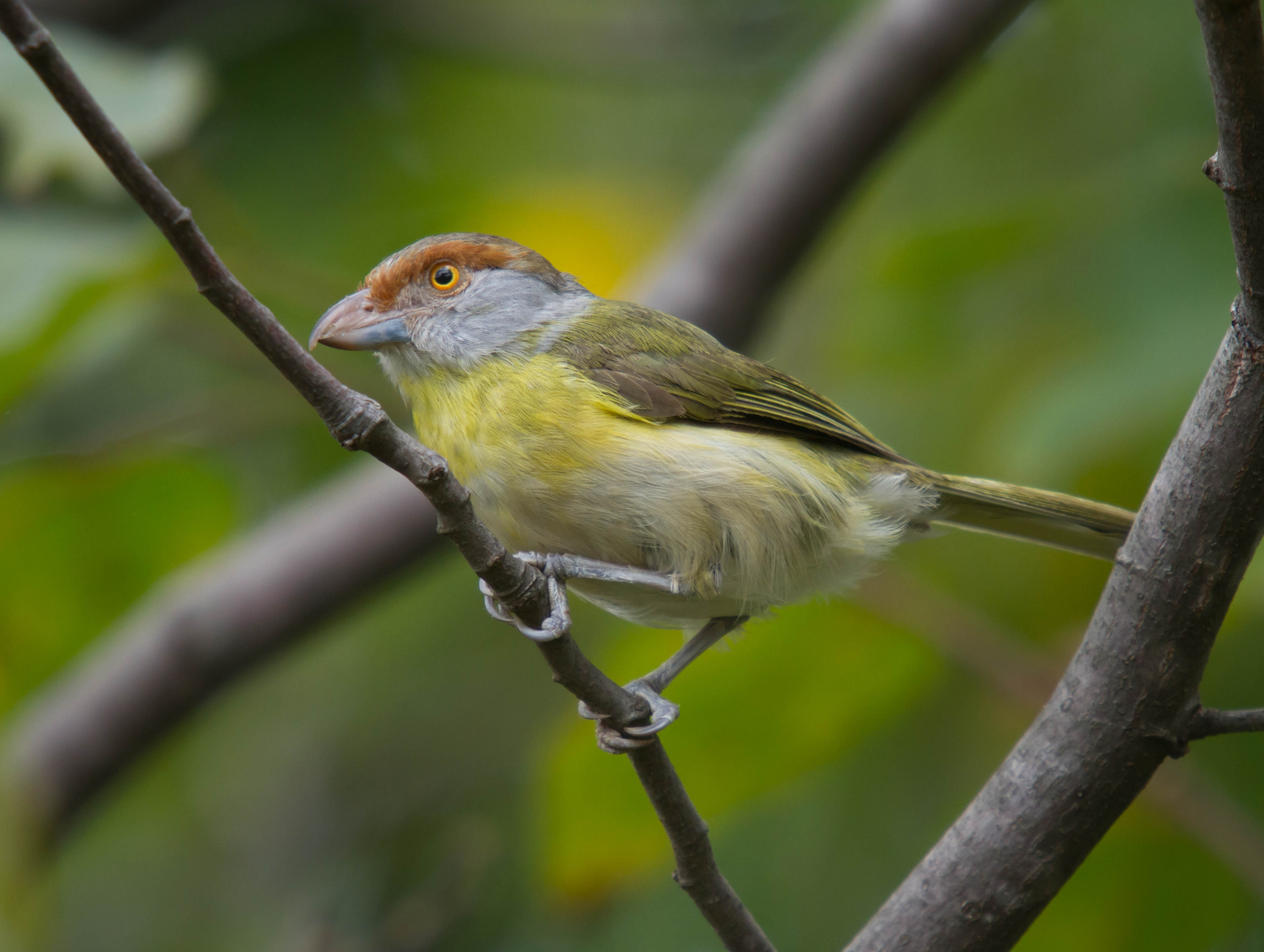
Individual from Goiânia, Brazil
