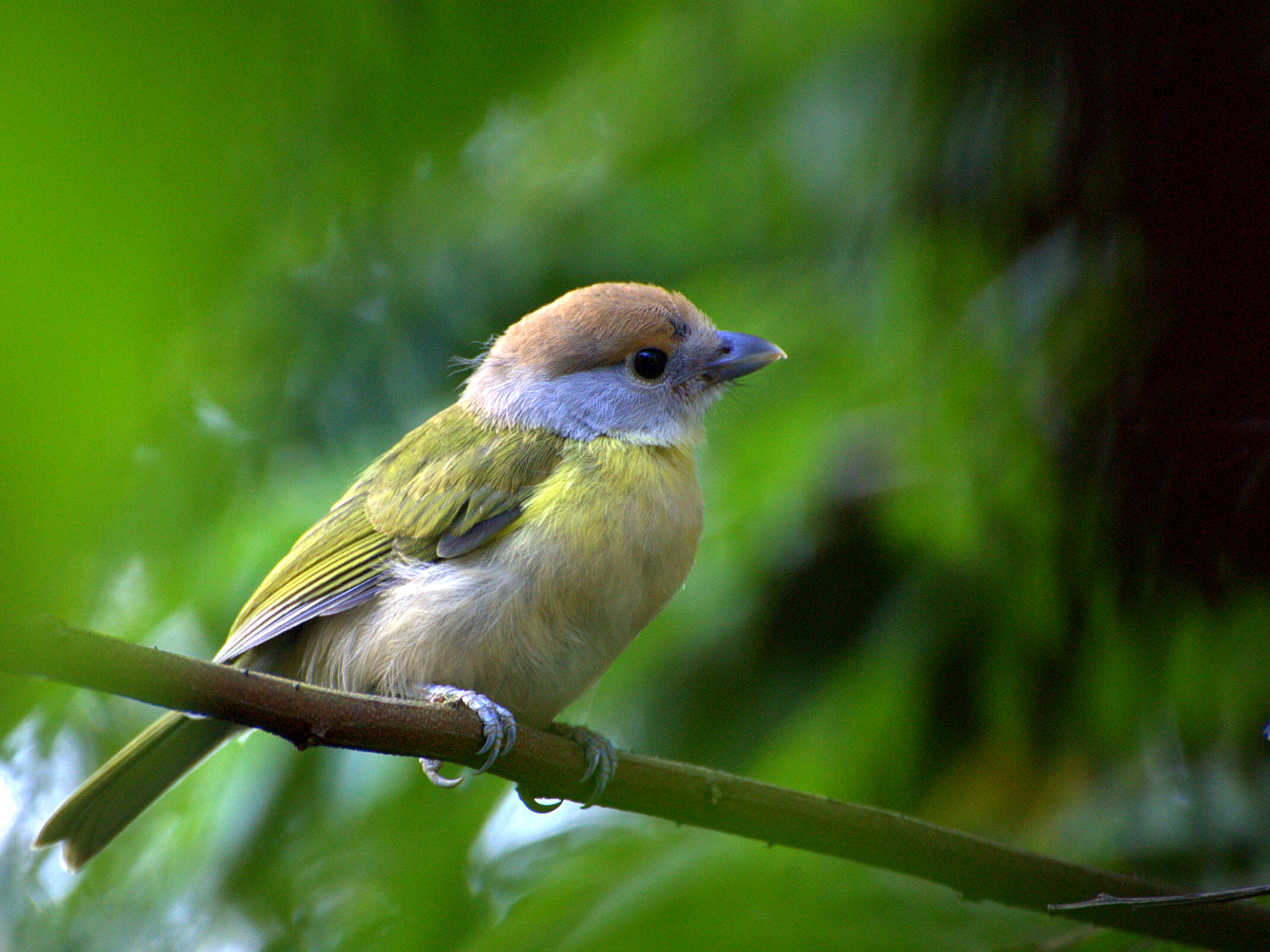
- Rufous-browed peppershrike (Cyclarhis gujanensis)

Scientific classification
- Kingdom: Animalia
- Phylum: Chordata
- Class: Aves
- Order: Passeriformes
- Family: Vireonidae
- Genus: Cyclarhis; Swainson, 1824

Type species
- Tanagra gujanensis Gmelin, JF, 1789

Species
- C. gujanensis; C. nigrirostris

= Peppershrike =

Peppershrikes

Genus of birds

The peppershrikes are two species of passerine bird found in tropical Central and South America. They form the genus Cyclarhis, part of the vireo family.

These are heavyset birds with a hooked shrike-like bill. Although sluggish and very vocal, the peppershrikes are still difficult to spot as they feed on insects and spiders in the canopy aloft. Their cup-shaped nests can likewise be found high in the trees.

== Taxonomy ==
The genus Cyclarhis was introduced in 1789 by the English naturalist William Swainson to accommodate a single species, the rufous-browed peppershrike, which is therefore the type species. The genus name is from the Ancient Greek kuklos meaning "circle" and rhis, rhinos meaning "nostrils". The genus contains two species.

== Species ==
Image	Common name	Scientific name	Distribution
	Rufous-browed peppershrike	C. gujanensis	Mexico and Trinidad south to Argentina and Uruguay.
	Black-billed peppershrike	C. nigrirostris	Colombia and northern Ecuador.
