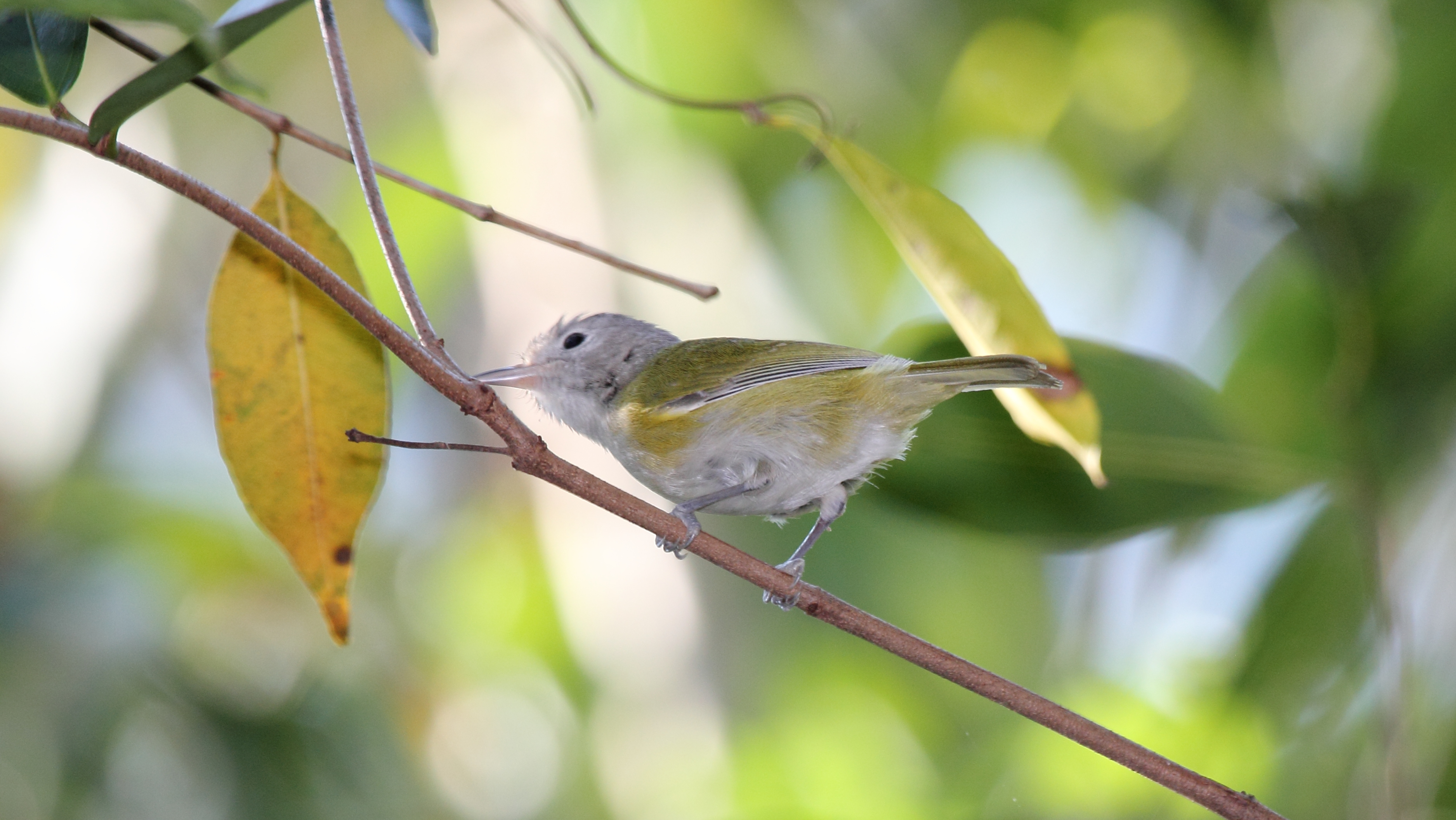

Conservation status
- Least Concern (IUCN 3.1)

Scientific classification
- Kingdom: Animalia
- Phylum: Chordata
- Class: Aves
- Order: Passeriformes
- Family: Vireonidae
- Genus: Pachysylvia
- Species: P. decurtata

Binomial name
- Pachysylvia decurtata (Bonaparte, 1838)

Synonyms
- Sylvicola decurtata; Hylophilus decurtatus

= Lesser greenlet =

Species of bird

The lesser greenlet (Pachysylvia decurtata) is a small passerine bird in the family Vireonidae, the vireos, greenlets, and shrike-babblers. It is found in Mexico, every Central American country, Colombia, Ecuador, and Peru.

== Taxonomy and systematics ==
The lesser greenlet was originally described in 1838 as Sylvicola decurtata. It later was renamed Hylophilus decurtatus and later still moved to its present genus Pachysylvia and its specific epithet returned to decurtata to match the feminine gender of the genus.

The lesser greenlet's further taxonomy is unsettled. The IOC, AviList, and BirdLife International's Handbook of the Birds of the World assign it these six subspecies:

- P. d. brevipennis (Giraud Jr, 1851)
- P. d. dickermani (Parkes, 1991)
- P. d. phillipsi (Parkes, 1991)
- P. d. decurtata (Bonaparte, 1838)
- P. d. darienensis Griscom, 1927
- P. d. minor (Berlepsch & Taczanowski, 1884)

However, the Clements taxonomy does not recognize P. d. brevipennis, P. d. dickermani, and P. d. phillipsi but includes them within the nominate P. d. decurtata.

Subspecies P. d. minor was for a time treated as a separate species, the gray-headed greenlet, but regained its present subspecies status because it intergrades with the nominate in Panama. The North American Classification Committee of the American Ornithological Society does note it as the "minor group" within the species. Clements similarly distinguishes it as the "lesser greenlet (gray-headed)" within the species.

This article follows the six-subspecies model.

== Description ==
The lesser greenlet is 9.4 to 10.2 cm (3.7 to 4.0 in) long and weighs 6.6 to 10.3 g (0.23 to 0.36 oz). The sexes have the same plumage. Adults of the nominate subspecies have a gray-blue crown and upper face. They have grayish lores, a whitish eye-ring, and often a pale stripe above the lores. Their upperparts are olive-green that is lighter on the rump. Their wings' primaries and secondaries are dark grayish with bright greenish outer webs. Their tail is grayish green. Their chin is whitish, their throat pale gray, their breast very pale lemon-yellow, their belly whitish, and their flanks and vent greenish yellow. Their underwing coverts are yellow.

The other subspecies of the lesser greenlet differ from the nominate and each other thus:

- P. d. brevipennis: pure gray crown, pale lores and ear coverts, grass-green back, and brighter green flanks than nominate
- P. d. dickermani: darker duller green back than nominate with white throat, little or no white on underparts, and much green on flanks
- P. d. phillipsi: crown sometimes tinged brown, duller and grayer upperparts than nominate with paler flanks and undertail coverts
- P. d. darienensis: olive wash on crown (similar color to its and nominate's back)
- P. d. minor: brighter upperparts than nominate with darker greenish yellow flanks

All subspecies have a dark brown iris, a dark gray maxilla, a pale gray to horn mandible, and pale gray or leaden blue legs and feet.

== Distribution and habitat ==
The subspecies of the lesser greenlet are found thus:

- P. d. brevipennis: eastern Mexico from southeastern San Luis Potosí
- P. d. dickermani: southeastern Mexico except the Yucatán Peninsula
- P. d. phillipsi: Mexico's Yucatán Peninsula and northern Belize
- P. d. decurtata: from Guatemala and southern Belize south on both slopes through Central America to the Panama Canal area
- P. d. darienensis: from the Canal area east into northwestern Colombia as far east as Santander Department
- P. d. minor: Pacific slope of western Colombia south through Ecuador just into far northwestern Peru's Tumbes Department

The lesser greenlet inhabits a variety of landscapes in the tropical zone. These include evergreen and deciduous forest, gallery forest, and secondary forest. In elevation it ranges from sea level to 1,400 m (4,600 ft) in northern Central America, 1,500 m (4,900 ft) in Costa Rica, 800 m (2,600 ft) in Colombia, 1,100 m (3,600 ft) in Ecuador, and 400 m (1,300 ft) in Peru.

== Behavior ==
=== Movement ===
The lesser greenlet is a year-round resident.

=== Feeding ===
The lesser greenlet feeds mostly on invertebrates and includes seeds in its diet as well. It forages in pairs or family groups and frequently joins mixed-species feeding flocks. It hunts actively, usually in the forest canopy though sometimes lower, taking prey mostly from live foliage but also dead leaf clusters. It sometimes hangs upside-down to feed.

=== Breeding ===
The lesser greenlet's breeding season has not been fully defined but spans at least March to June in Belize and February to May in Costa Rica; it includes May in northwestern Colombia. Its nest is a deep cup made from dead leaves, strips of bamboo, and grass lined with fine plant fibers. It typically is attached with spider web in a branch fork between about 4 and 14 m (15 and 45 ft) above the ground. The clutch is two eggs that are white with pale brown spots and blotches. The incubation period is about 16 days and apparently only the female incubates. Fledging occurs about 12 days after hatch and both parents provision nestlings.

=== Vocalization ===
The lesser greenlet's song is "a pleasant, rather quiet series of 2–3 phrases, continuously repeated and then changing into different motif, chi-chi-cher cher cher". Its calls include "a faint churr or a dry, rolled rattle, and various harsh, scolding nasal notes".

== Status ==
The IUCN has assessed the lesser greenlet as being of Least Concern. It has a very large range; its estimated population of at least 500,000 mature individuals is believed to be decreasing. No immediate threats have been identified. It is considered "common" in northern Central America, "very common" in Costa Rica, "fairly common" in Colombia. "often numerous" in Ecuador, and "locally fairly common" in Peru. It is "[a]ble to adapt to modified habitats, including regenerating forest".
