= Babbler =

Babbler may refer to:

- Various small passerine birds:
  - The Old World babblers, of the family Timaliidae, formerly a much larger family including most of the genera and families listed below.
  - The Ground babblers of family Pellorneidae.
  - Many species in the genera Argya and Turdoides in family Leiothrichidae.
  - The shrike-babblers of genus Pteruthius in family Vireonidae.
  - The jewel-babblers of genus Ptilorrhoa in family Cinclosomatidae.
  - Australo-Papuan babbler, passerine birds endemic to Australia-New Guinea.
- Babbler (Dungeons & Dragons), a fictional monster.
- Vic Babbler, the newsletter of Birds Australia – Victoria.
