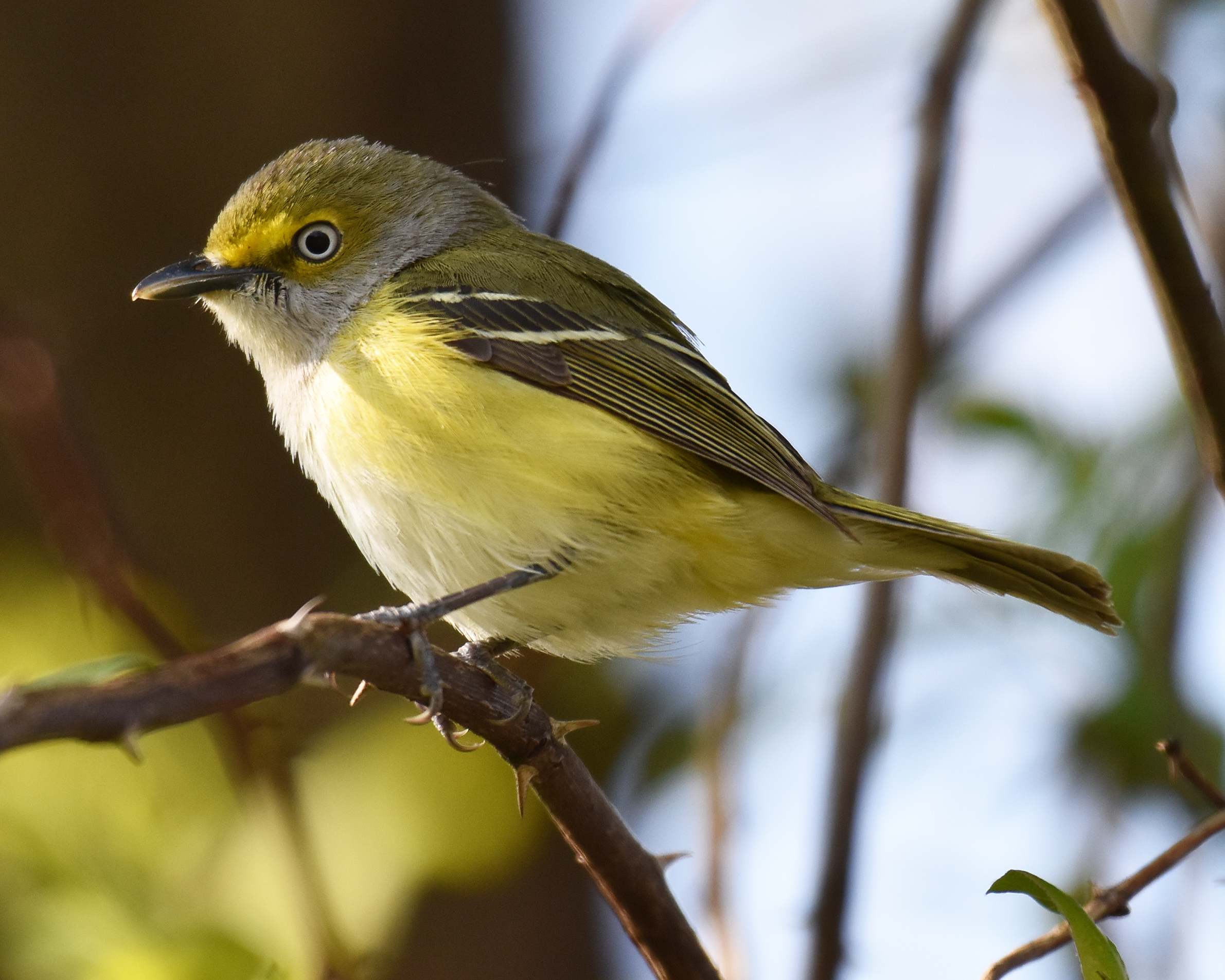

Conservation status
- Least Concern (IUCN 3.1)

Scientific classification
- Kingdom: Animalia
- Phylum: Chordata
- Class: Aves
- Order: Passeriformes
- Family: Vireonidae
- Genus: Vireo
- Species: V. griseus

Binomial name
- Vireo griseus (Boddaert, 1783)

Audio
- Song

= White-eyed vireo =

White-eyed vireo Temporal range: Late Pleistocene–present

Species of bird

The white-eyed vireo (Vireo griseus) is a small songbird of the family Vireonidae.

== Distribution and habitat ==
It breeds in the eastern United States from New England west to northern Missouri and south to Texas and Florida, and also in eastern Mexico, northern Central America, Cuba and the Bahamas. Populations on the US Gulf Coast and further south are resident, but most North American birds migrate south in winter. This vireo frequents bushes and shrubs in abandoned cultivation or overgrown pastures.

== Breeding ==
They nest near the ground in tangled thickets. Nests are made of weeds, leaves, grass, bark or bits of trash. The grass-lined nest is a neat cup shape, attached to a fork in a tree branch by spider webs. It lays 3–5 dark-spotted white eggs. Both the male and female incubate the eggs for 12–16 days. The young leave the nest 9–11 days after hatching.

== Description ==
Measurements:

- Length: 4.3–5.1 in (11–13 cm)
- Weight: 0.3–0.5 oz (10–14 g)
- Wingspan: 6.7 in (17 cm)

Its head and back are a greyish olive, and the underparts are white with yellow flanks. The wings and tail are dark, and there are two white wing bars on each wing. The eyes have white irises, and are surrounded by yellow spectacles. Sexes are similar.

== Call ==
The white-eyed vireo's song is highly variable, consisting of a rapid series of notes bookended by sharp 'chip' notes.

== Diet ==
During the breeding season, the diet of this species consists almost exclusively of insects, primarily caterpillars and stink bugs (Pentatomidae); beetles, flies, wasps, snails, and very rarely small vertebrates are also consumed. In the autumn and winter it supplements its diet of insects with berries.

== Taxonomy ==
French polymath Georges-Louis Leclerc, Comte de Buffon described the white-eyed vireo in his Histoire naturelle des oiseaux. The bird was illustrated in a hand-coloured plate engraved by François-Nicolas Martinet in the Planches Enluminées D'Histoire Naturelle which was produced under the supervision of Edme-Louis Daubenton to accompany Buffon's text. Neither the plate caption nor Buffon's description included a scientific name. In 1783 the Dutch naturalist Pieter Boddaert coined the binomial name Tanagra grisea in his catalogue of the Planches Enluminées. Buffon specified that his specimen had come from Louisiana, but in 1945 the type locality was restricted to New Orleans. The white-eyed vireo is now placed in the genus Vireo which was introduced in 1808 by the French ornithologist Louis Pierre Vieillot. The word vireo was used by Latin authors for a small green migratory bird, probably a Eurasian golden oriole but a European greenfinch has also been suggested. The specific epithet griseus is Medieval Latin for grey.

Six subspecies are recognised:

- V. g. griseus (Boddaert, 1783) – central and east US (includes noveboracensis)
- V. g. maynardi Brewster, 1887 – south Florida (southeast US)
- V. g. bermudianus Bangs & Bradlee, 1901 – Bermuda
- V. g. micrus Nelson, 1899 – south Texas (south US) and northeast Mexico
- V. g. perquisitor Nelson, 1900 – east Mexico
- V. g. marshalli Phillips, AR, 1991 – east central Mexico

The fully migratory northern subspecies, V. g. noveboracensis, occupies most of the range of this species. This sub-species is larger and has more brightly colored plumage than all other subspecies.

The resident southeastern coastal plain race, V. g. griseus is a slightly smaller and duller colored subspecies. It typically remains in its breeding range in the winter.

The resident Florida Keys race, V. g. maynardi, is greyer above and whiter below, and the south Texan V. g. micrus is like a smaller maynardi.

V. g. bermudianus is endemic to Bermuda, where it is known as the Chick of the Village. This subspecies has shorter wings and a duller plumage than its mainland conspecifics. Along with other endemic and native Bermudian birds, it was threatened with extinction following the loss of 8 million Bermuda cedar trees in the 1940s, though the population is currently estimated to be stable at approximately 2000 individuals. This species is listed under the Bermuda Protected Species Act 2003.

== Gallery ==
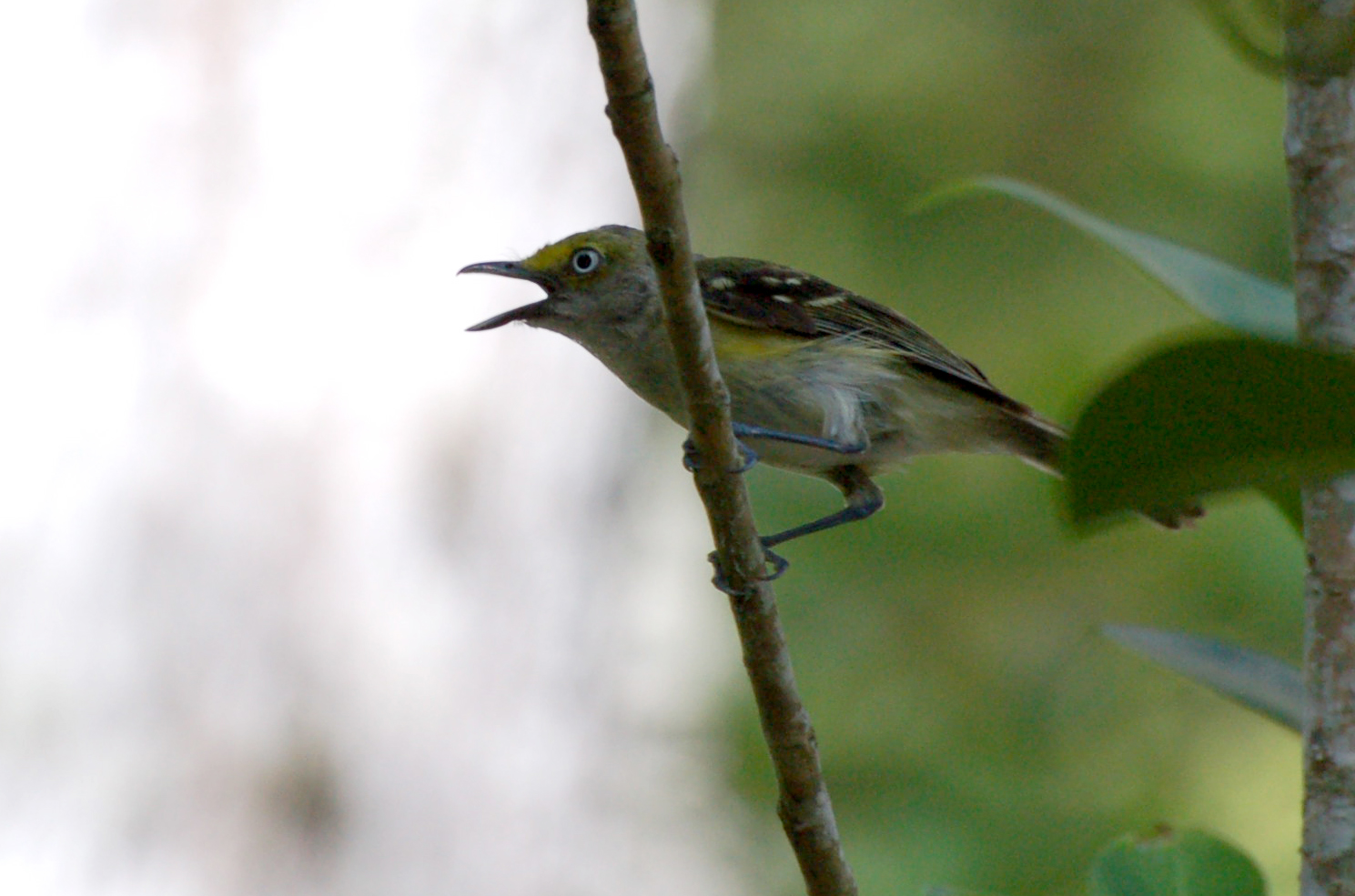
White-eyed vireo

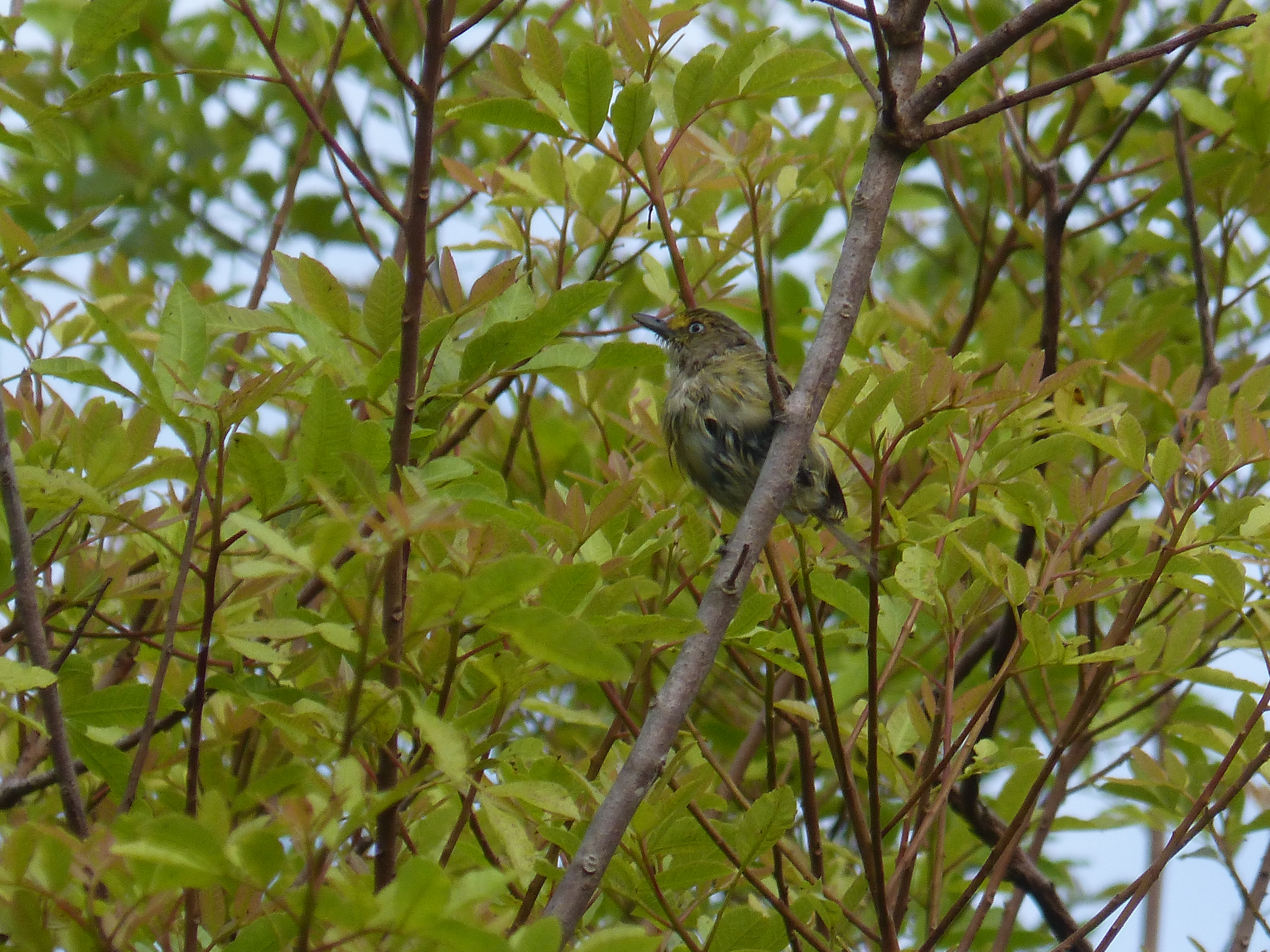
The Bermuda subspecies pictured here, Vireo griseus bermudianus, has shorter wings and duller colour than its mainland conspecifics.

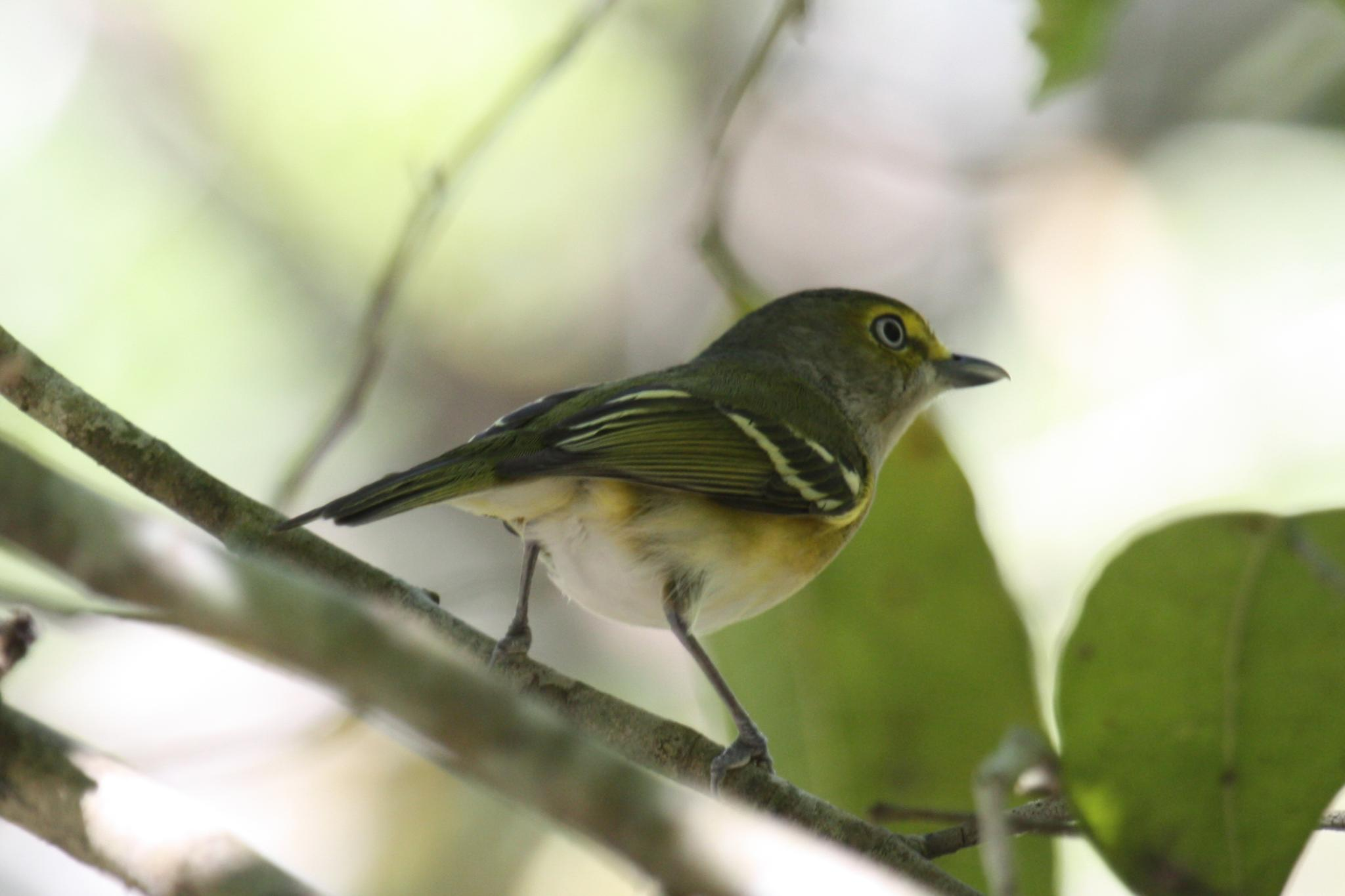
White-eyed vireo
