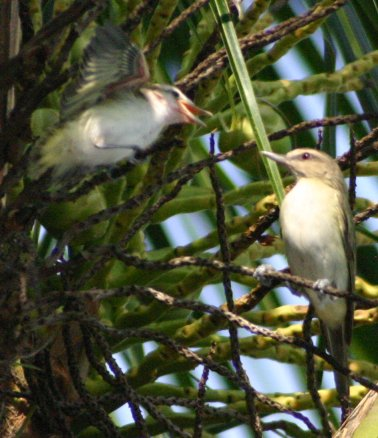

Conservation status
- Least Concern (IUCN 3.1)

Scientific classification
- Kingdom: Animalia
- Phylum: Chordata
- Class: Aves
- Order: Passeriformes
- Family: Vireonidae
- Genus: Vireo
- Species: V. altiloquus

Binomial name
- Vireo altiloquus (Vieillot, 1808)
- Breeding Year-round Non-Breeding

= Black-whiskered vireo =

Species of bird

The black-whiskered vireo (Vireo altiloquus) is a small passerine bird in the family Vireonidae, the vireos, greenlets, and shrike-babblers. It is found in Florida, the Bahamas, many Caribbean islands, and northern and Amazonian South America.

== Taxonomy and systematics ==
The black-whiskered vireo was originally described in 1808 as Muscicapa altiloqua, mistakenly placing it in the Old World flycatcher family. It was at various times also called Vireosylva altiloqua and Vireo calidris.

The black-whiskered vireo has these six subspecies:

- V. a. barbatulus (Cabanis, 1855)
- V. a. altiloquus (Vieillot, 1808)
- V. a. barbadensis (Ridgway, 1874)
- V. a. bonairensis Phelps, WH & Phelps, WH Jr, 1948
- V. a. grandior (Ridgway, 1884)
- V. a. canescens (Cory, 1887)

== Description ==
The black-whiskered vireo is 15 to 16.5 cm (5.9 to 6.5 in) long. The nominate subspecies V. a. altiloquus weighs an average of 18 g (0.63 oz). The sexes have the same plumage. Adults of the nominate subspecies have a bluish gray forehead and crown with a buff-olive tinge, a buffy whitish supercilium from the bill past the eye, a wide dusky stripe through the eye, and the eponymous black "whisker" on the sides of the throat. Their nape and upperparts are olive-green. Their remiges are mostly brownish black with small white tips, wide whitish or cream edges on the inner webs, and thin yellowish olive edges on the outer webs. Their rectrices are mostly brownish with thin yellowish olive edges on the outer webs and thin white or cream edges on the inner webs of the outer three pairs. Their underparts are mostly whitish with a slight buff and greenish olive tinge on the throat and upper breast, a pale olive wash on the side and flanks, and lemon-yellow undertail coverts.

The other subspecies differ from the nominate and each other thus:

- V. a. barbatulus: grayish-tinged olive back and rump and whiter underparts than nominate
- V. a. barbadensis: pale gray wash on supercilium and lighter green upperparts than barbatulus
- V. a. bonairensis: olive-buff back; less buff on underparts than nominate
- V. a. grandior: yellowish sides and flanks and pale yellow undertail coverts
- V. a. canescens: grayish olive upperparts, whitish sides, flanks, and undertail coverts

All subspecies have a reddish brown iris, a stout black bill, and black legs and feet.

== Distribution and habitat ==
The black-whiskered vireo is found in southern Florida, the Bahamas, the Greater and Lesser Antilles, Providencia and San Andrés islands, the ABC islands, Trinidad and Tobago, and the mainland South American countries of Brazil, Colombia, Guyana, Suriname, and Venezuela. It also occurs casually or has occurred as a vagrant in Mexico, Belize, Costa Rica, Panama, along the U. S. gulf coast, on the U. S. east coast from Virginia south, in Bermuda, in French Guiana, and in Peru.

The subspecies of the black-whiskered vireo are found thus:

- V. a. barbatulus: breeds in southern Florida, Bahamas, Cuba, and Little Cayman and Cayman Brac in the Cayman Islands; winters in the Amazon Basin
- V. a. altiloquus: resident on Hispaniola; breeds in Jamaica and Puerto Rico; winters in northern South America; casual on U. S. gulf coast
- V. a. barbadensis: primarily resident in Lesser Antilles from St. Croix to Barbados
- V. a. bonairensis: resident on Aruba, Bonaire, Curaçao, and Venezuela's Los Roques and Margarita islands
- V. a. grandior: resident on Providencia Island
- V. a. canescens: resident on San Andrés Island

The black-whiskered vireo inhabits a variety of landscapes throughout its range. In Florida it primarily occurs in coastal mangroves and subtropical hardwood hammocks and to a lesser degree the edges of suburban woodlands. Throughout the Caribbean it occurs in "[a]ll forest types at all elevations". These include mangroves, coastal woodlands, hardwood forest on limestone, scrubby forest, and montane forest. In northern South America (Colombia, Venezuela, and the Guianas) it tends to favor the edges of moist to humid forest. In the Amazon Basin it is found on the edges and clearings in evergreen forest both primary and secondary. One source states that it ranges in elevation from sea level to about 900 m (3,000 ft). However, the "all elevations" stated in another source would extend to about 3,000 m (9,800 ft) on Hispaniola. It reaches 1,300 m (4,300 ft) in Colombia, 2,000 m (6,600 ft) in mainland Venezuela, and 1,000 m (3,300 ft) in Brazil.

== Behavior ==
=== Movement ===
The black-whiskered vireo is a partial migrant. The population of V. a. altiloquus on Hispaniola and the three subspecies V. a. bonairensis, V. a. grandior, and V. a. canescens on their smaller islands are year-round residents, though there is evidence of elevational movements on Hispaniola. As far as is known the entire population of V. a. barbatulus vacates its breeding grounds for the winter. The Jamaican and Puerto Rican populations of V. a. altiloquus and at least some members of V. a. barbadensis in the Lesser Antilles also migrate.

=== Sociality ===
During the breeding season the black-whiskered vireo is mostly seen singly or in pairs; small family groups remain together for a short time after fledging. The migratory subspecies form flocks during the winter.

=== Feeding ===
The black-whiskered vireo feeds on fruit and arthropods in about equal amounts though the ratio varies with season and location. Where its foraging behavior has been studied in Puerto Rico and Jamaica it takes most food by gleaning from foliage while perched though sometimes while briefly hovering after a short sally. It also gleans from bark and twigs and only rarely takes insects in mid-air.

=== Breeding ===
The black-whiskered vireo breeds from late April to at least mid-August overall though the timing varies among the various populations. The female along builds the cup nest from grasses, bark, and plant fibers held together and attached to a branch fork with spider web. In most areas the clutch is three eggs that are white with a few brown to purplish brown spots. The female alone incubates for about 14 days. Fledging occurs about 11 days after hatch. The female alone broods nestlings but both parents provision them. Nests are parasitized by the shiny cowbird (Molothrus bonairensis) throughout the vireo's range. There are a few records from Florida of nests parasitized by the brown-headed cowbird (M. ater). In one study in Puerto Rico about 70% of nests were destroyed by predators but their identity is not known. Mammals, other birds, and snakes are all possible nest predators there.

=== Vocalization ===
Migratory black-whiskered vireos sing during the breeding season and are silent on the wintering grounds. Nonmigratory populations sing year-round but more frequently during the breeding season. In the West Indies the black-whiskered vireo sings monotonously throughout the day, "[s]hort, melodious 2- to 3-syllable phrases, each different, separated by pauses". There is identifiable variation among populations but all follow a similar pattern. Some songs are written as "whip-Tom-Kelly" and "sweet-John! —John-to-whit!—Sweet-John-to-whit!—John-t'-whit —Sweet-John-to-whit!". The species also makes a variety of calls including a "tsit and nasal yeeea", "whit-whit", a "harsh nasal mew scold", chatters, and squeaks. Only males sing, typically from a perch in the forest canopy.

== Status ==
The IUCN has assessed the black-whiskered vireo as being of Least Concern. It has an extremely large range and an estimated population of about 6.2 million mature individuals. The population's trend is not known. No immediate threats have been identified. It is considered common in its limited Florida range. It is common in the West Indies, uncommon in Colombia, "vagrant or transient" in mainland Venezuela, and "uncommon to rare" in Brazil.
