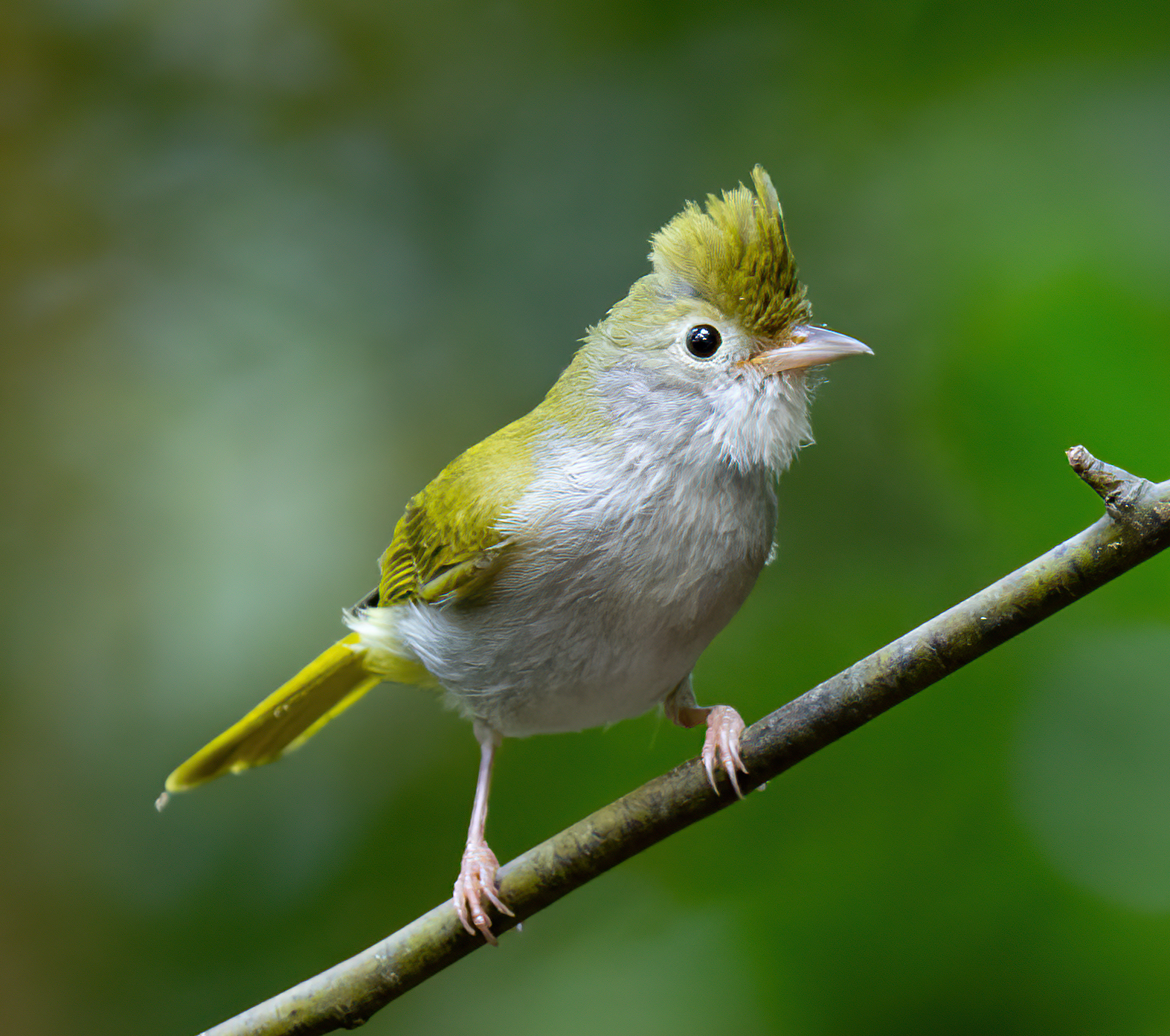

Conservation status
- Least Concern (IUCN 3.1)

Scientific classification
- Kingdom: Animalia
- Phylum: Chordata
- Class: Aves
- Order: Passeriformes
- Family: Vireonidae
- Genus: Erpornis; Hodgson, 1844
- Species: E. zantholeuca

Binomial name
- Erpornis zantholeuca Blyth, 1844

Synonyms
- Yuhina zantholeuca

= White-bellied erpornis =

Species of bird

The white-bellied erpornis (Erpornis zantholeuca) or simply erpornis is a species of bird. It is the only member of the genus Erpornis. This bird is found in Bangladesh, Bhutan, Brunei, Cambodia, China, India, Indonesia, Laos, Malaysia, Myanmar, Nepal, Singapore, Taiwan, Thailand, and Vietnam. Its natural habitat is subtropical or tropical moist montane forests.

== Taxonomy ==
Formerly placed in Yuhina and often still misleadingly called "white-bellied yuhina", it is the most distinct member of this "genus" in its obsolete paraphyletic delimitation. It is by no means closely related to the Timaliidae (Old World babblers), where most of the former members of Yuhina are still placed. The Timaliidae are members of the superfamily Sylvioidea in infraorder Passeri, whereas the erpornis is the closest relative of the vireos (Vireonidae), which are a more ancient lineage of songbirds. Indeed, it now is usually included in the Vireonidae as one of their few Old World representatives.

Several subspecies are recognised: E. z zantholeuca, E. z tyrannula, E. z griseiloris, E. z sordida, E. z canescens, E. z interposita, E. z saani and E. z brunnescens.

== Description ==
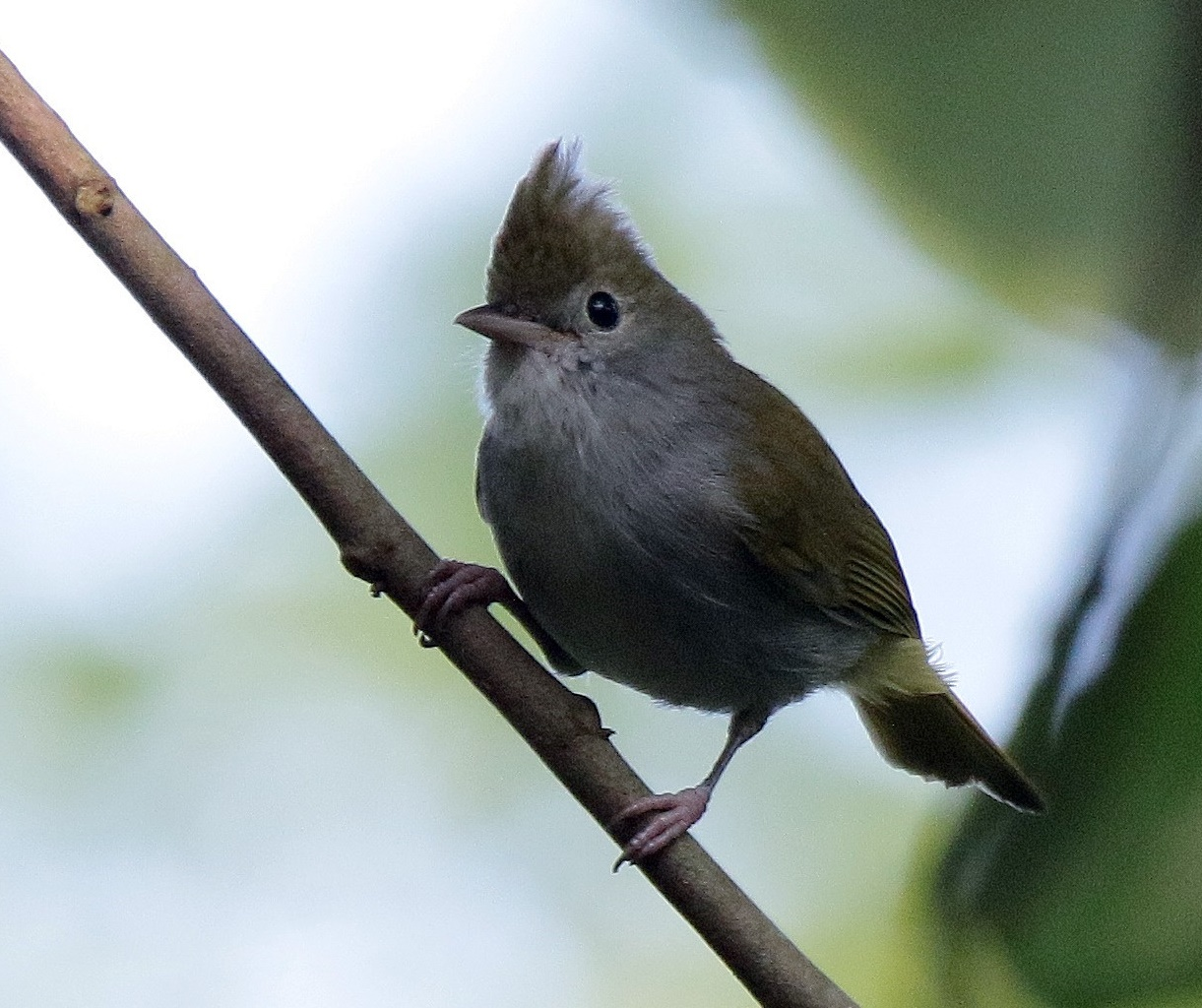
White-bellied Erpornis from Vietnam

In its coloration, morphology and acrobatic habits, this bird resembles a vireo quite a lot. However, it has a prominent crest like many yuhinas, which together with the unusual biogeography has served to obscure its true relationships for a long time. The crested head, back, wings and tail of this bird are olivaceous or golden brown while the underparts are white.

Erpornis possesses well-developed musculature for gaping or opening the bill forcefully and may use this to pry bark from trees to seek insects.

== Status ==
The white-bellied erpornis is listed by the IUCN as being of "Least Concern" as it has a very wide range and is common within much of that range. It is estimated that there may be 10,000 to 100,000 breeding pairs in China and a similar number in Taiwan.

== See also ==
- Black-capped donacobius and
- Wrentit, New World members of the Sylvioidea which are the closest relatives of (or belong to) the Old World Megaluridae and Sylviidae, respectively
- Shrike-babblers, genus Pteruthius; traditionally placed in the Timaliidae but perhaps the closest living relatives of the Erpornis
