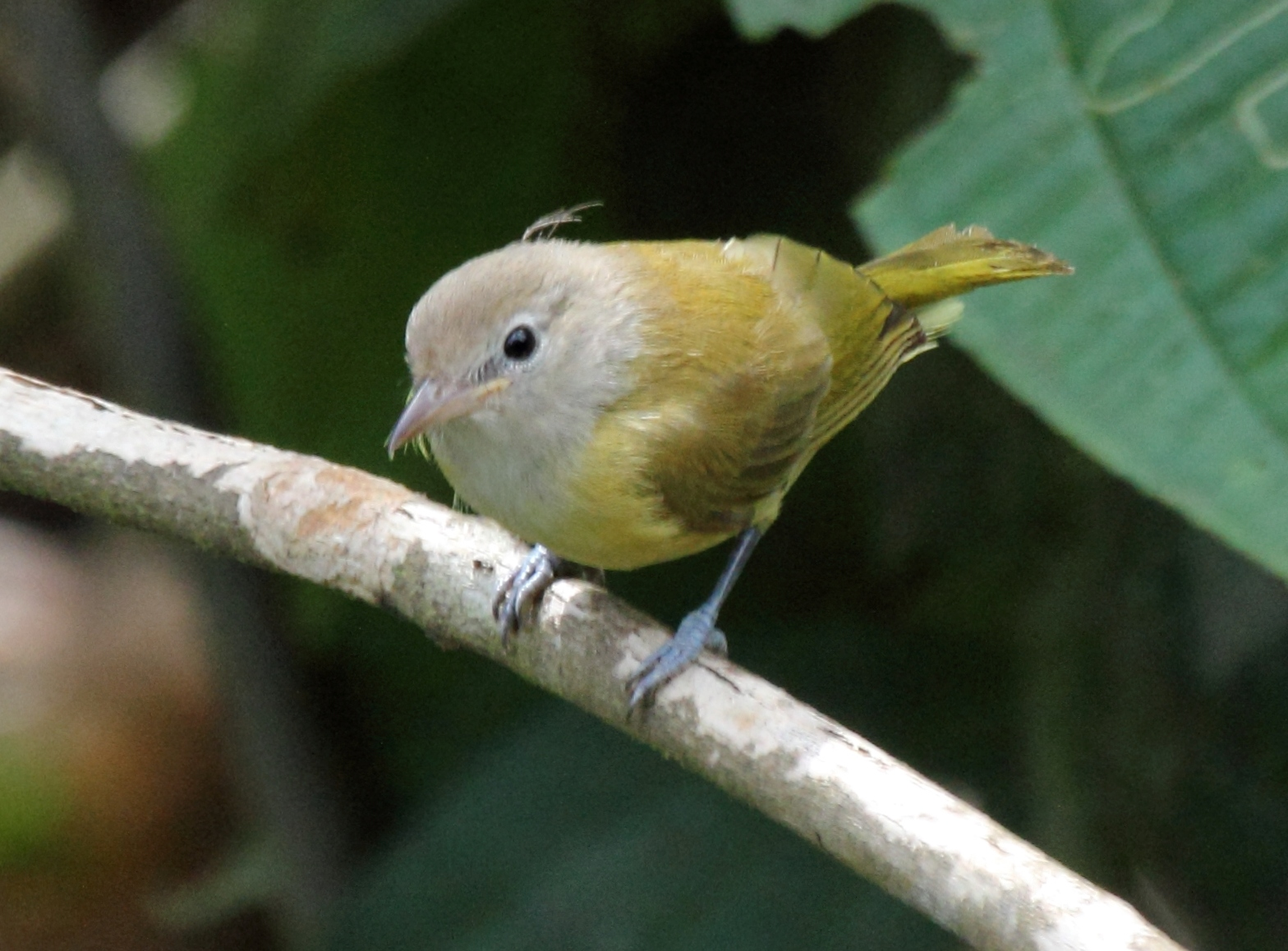

Conservation status
- Least Concern (IUCN 3.1)

Scientific classification
- Kingdom: Animalia
- Phylum: Chordata
- Class: Aves
- Order: Passeriformes
- Family: Vireonidae
- Genus: Pachysylvia
- Species: P. hypoxantha

Binomial name
- Pachysylvia hypoxantha (Pelzeln, 1868)

Synonyms
- See text

Audio

= Dusky-capped greenlet =

Species of bird

The dusky-capped greenlet (Pachysylvia hypoxantha) is a species of bird in the family Vireonidae, the vireos, greenlets, and shrike-babblers. It is found in Bolivia, Brazil, Colombia, Ecuador, Peru, and Venezuela.

== Taxonomy and systematics ==
The dusky-capped greenlet was originally described in 1868 as Hylophilus hypoxanthus. For a time early in the twentieth century it was considered a subspecies of the golden-fronted greenlet (P. aurantiifrons) but beginning in the 1930s it attained its status as a full species.

The dusky-capped greenlet has these six subspecies:

- Pachysylvia hypoxantha hypoxantha (Pelzeln, 1868)
- Pachysylvia hypoxantha fuscicapillus (Sclater, PL & Salvin, 1880)
- Pachysylvia hypoxantha flaviventris (Cabanis, 1873)
- Pachysylvia hypoxantha icterica (Bond, J, 1953)
- Pachysylvia hypoxantha albigula Chapman, 1921
- Pachysylvia hypoxantha inornata Snethlage, E, 1914

Some mid-twentieth century authors treated P. h. inornata as a subspecies of the brown-headed greenlet (Hylophilus brunneiceps). Subspecies P. h. flaviventris was described as a full species and often treated that way until the mid-twentieth century.

== Description ==
The dusky-capped greenlet is 11.5 to 12 cm (4.5 to 4.7 in) long and weighs about 17 g (0.60 oz). The sexes have the same plumage. Adults of the nominate subspecies P. h. hypoxantha have a dull olive-brown forehead, crown, and nape. Their back is buffy olive and their rump a brighter yellowish olive. Their wings' primaries and secondaries are dull blackish gray with greenish edges on the outer webs. Their tail is yellowish olive with brighter edges on the feathers' outer webs and bases. Their chin and throat are dull buffy whitish and the rest of their underparts are pale yellow with a slight buffy wash.

The other subspecies of the dusky-capped greenlet differ from the nominate and each other thus:

- Pachysylvia hypoxantha fuscicapillus: much browner upperparts than nominate though with greenish rump; pale yellow throat and strong yellow (no buff) breast
- Pachysylvia hypoxantha flaviventris: duller brown upperparts than fuscicapillus with citrine cast on back; whitish throat and upper breast and strong yellow belly
- Pachysylvia hypoxantha icterica: similar to flaviventris with brighter more yellow upperparts
- Pachysylvia hypoxantha albigula: similar to fuscicapillus with darker crown and paler underparts
- Pachysylvia hypoxantha inornata: sepia-brown crown, brighter sepia-brown back, olive rump, light gray chin and throat; grayish-olive breast and olive-washed light gray belly, both with yellow mixed in

All subspecies have a gray-brown iris, a dark brown maxilla, a pale brown or pinkish mandible, and gray legs and feet.

== Distribution and habitat ==
The subspecies of the dusky-capped greenlet are found thus:

- Pachysylvia hypoxantha hypoxantha: southeastern third of Colombia, east slightly into southwestern Venezuela's Amazonas state, and southeast into northwestern Brazil to the Solimões (Upper Amazon) river
- Pachysylvia hypoxantha fuscicapillus: eastern Ecuador south into northern Peru to the Marañón River
- Pachysylvia hypoxantha flaviventris: eastern Peru from the Marañón south to Ayacucho Department
- Pachysylvia hypoxantha icterica: extreme southeastern Peru, northern Bolivia, and western Brazil
- Pachysylvia hypoxantha albigula: northern Brazil south of the Amazon between the Purus River and the Iriri and Xingu rivers
- Pachysylvia hypoxantha inornata: northern Brazil south of the Amazon from the Tapajós River east to the Tocantins River

The dusky-capped greenlet inhabits humid terra firme and várzea forest, where it favors the subcanopy and canopy. In Brazil it ranges in elevation from near sea level to 500 m (1,600 ft). It reaches 800 m (2,600 ft) in Colombia, is mostly below 400 m (1,300 ft) in Ecuador, and reaches 1,100 m (3,600 ft) in Peru and at least 200 m (700 ft) and probably higher in Venezuela.

== Behavior ==
=== Movement ===
The dusky-capped greenlet is believed to be a sedentary year-round resident.

=== Feeding ===
The dusky-capped greenlet's diet has not been fully examined but is known to include adult and larval insects. It feeds actively, often hanging upside-down to glean prey from leaves. It usually forages in pairs and frequently joins mixed-species feeding flocks.

=== Breeding ===
Nothing is known about the dusky-capped greenlet's breeding biology.

=== Vocalization ===
The dusky-capped greenlet's song has been described as a "very high, cheerful is-it-so-wit or pichí-soweér". Its call is "a wheezy dee-dee".

== Conservation status ==
The IUCN has assessed the dusky-capped greenlet as being of Least Concern. It has a very large range; its population size is not known and is believed to be decreasing. No immediate threats have been identified. It is considered "uncommon" in Colombia, "obscure" in Ecuador, "widespread and fairly common" in Peru, and "common to frequent" in Brazil. It is known in Venezuela from only a few records.
