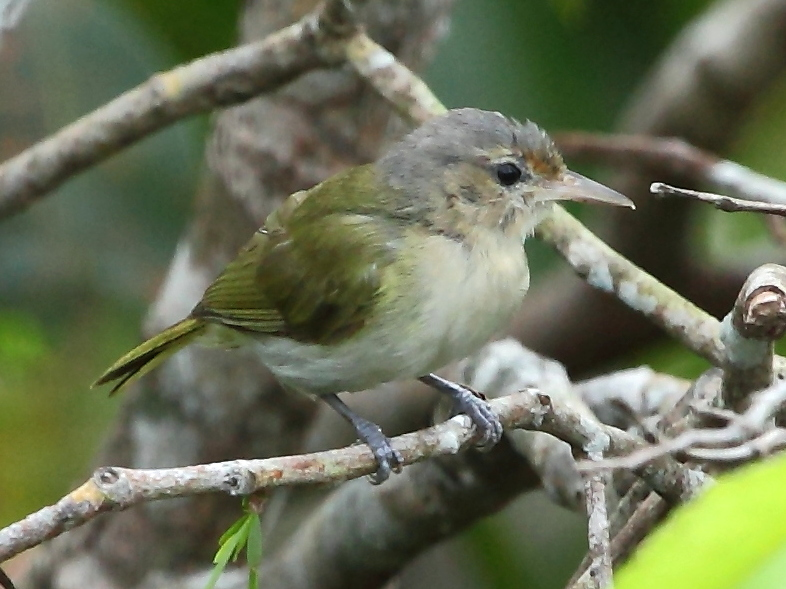
- At Manaus, Amazonas state, Brazil

Conservation status
- Least Concern (IUCN 3.1)

Scientific classification
- Kingdom: Animalia
- Phylum: Chordata
- Class: Aves
- Order: Passeriformes
- Family: Vireonidae
- Genus: Pachysylvia
- Species: P. muscicapina

Binomial name
- Pachysylvia muscicapina (Sclater, PL & Salvin, 1873)

Synonyms
- Hylophilus muscicapinus

= Buff-cheeked greenlet =

Species of bird

The buff-cheeked greenlet (Pachysylvia muscicapina) is a species of bird in the family Vireonidae, the vireos, greenlets, and shrike-babblers. It is found in Bolivia, Brazil, French Guiana, Guyana, Suriname, and Venezuela.

== Taxonomy and systematics ==
The buff-cheeked greenlet was originally described in 1873 as Hylophilus muscicapinus.

The buff-cheeked greenlet has two subspecies, the nominate P. m. muscicapina (Sclater, PL & Salvin, 1873) and P. m. griseifrons (Snethlage, E, 1907).

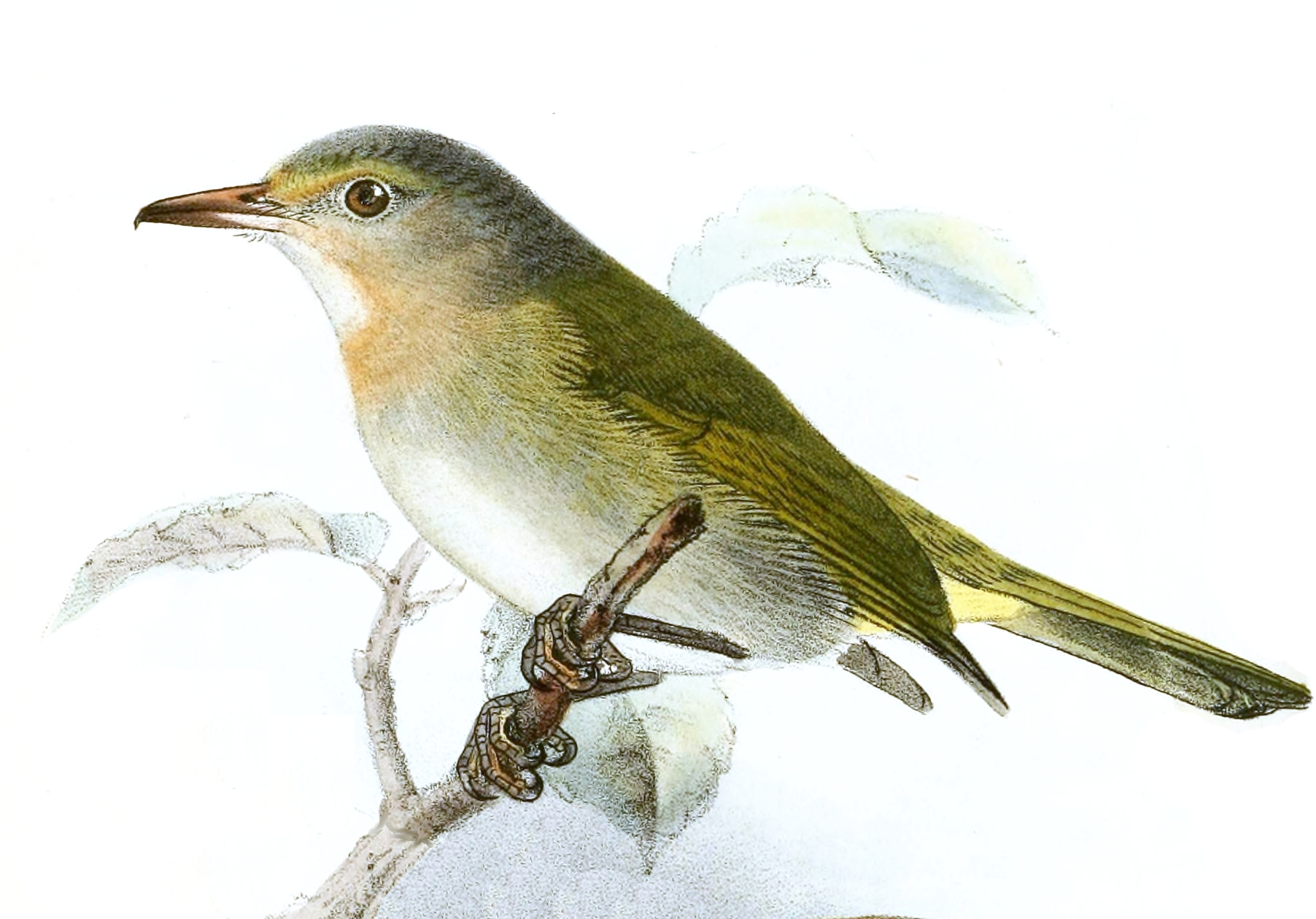
"Hylophilus muscicapinus" illustration by Keulemans, 1881

== Description ==
The buff-cheeked greenlet is 11.5 to 12 cm (4.5 to 4.7 in) long and weighs 9.5 to 13.5 g (0.34 to 0.48 oz). The sexes have the same plumage. Adults of the nominate subspecies have a gray-brown forehead and a blue-gray crown and nape. They have a buffy supercilium and blackish gray mottled ear coverts on an otherwise buffy-brown face. Their upperparts are greenish that is lighter on the rump. Their wings' primaries and secondaries are dark blackish gray with wide greenish edges on the outer webs. Their tail is dull greenish. Their chin and throat are off-white, their breast grayish buff, their belly grayish white, and their flanks yellowish. Subspecies P. m. griseifrons has a pure gray forehead and a deeper buffy rufous supercilium and face than the nominate with brighter green upperparts and a more buffy throat and breast. Both subspecies have a sepia, brown, or gray iris, a blackish maxilla, a pinkish mandible, and pale pinkish or light gray legs and feet.

== Distribution and habitat ==
The nominate subspecies of the buff-cheeked greenlet is the more northerly of the two. It is found in eastern Venezuela's Amazonas, Bolívar, and southern Delta Amacuro states east to the Atlantic through the Guianas and northern Brazil north of the Amazon. Subspecies P. m. griseifrons is found in Brazil south of the Amazon between the Madeira and Tapajós rivers and south to Mato Grosso and southern Goiás and into extreme northeastern Bolivia. The species inhabits humid terra firme and várzea forest where it frequents the mid-story to canopy. In Brazil it ranges in elevation from sea level to 600 m (2,000 ft). It reaches 1,100 m (3,600 ft) in Venezuela.

== Behavior ==
=== Movement ===
The buff-cheeked greenlet is believed to be a sedentary year-round resident.

=== Feeding ===
The buff-cheeked greenlet's diet has not been fully examined but is known to include insects and spiders. It feeds actively, often hanging upside-down to glean prey from leaves. It usually forages in pairs or small family groups and frequently joins mixed-species feeding flocks.

=== Breeding ===
The buff-cheeked greenlet is believed to breed between December and May in Venezuela. Nothing else is known about the species' breeding biology.

=== Vocalization ===
The buff-cheeked greenlet's song is described as a "high, warbling weet-oh-weeréet".

== Status ==
The IUCN has assessed the buff-cheeked greenlet as being of Least Concern. It has a large range; its population size is not known and is believed to be decreasing. No immediate threats have been identified. It is considered "frequent to uncommon" in Brazil and "common" in Venezuela.
