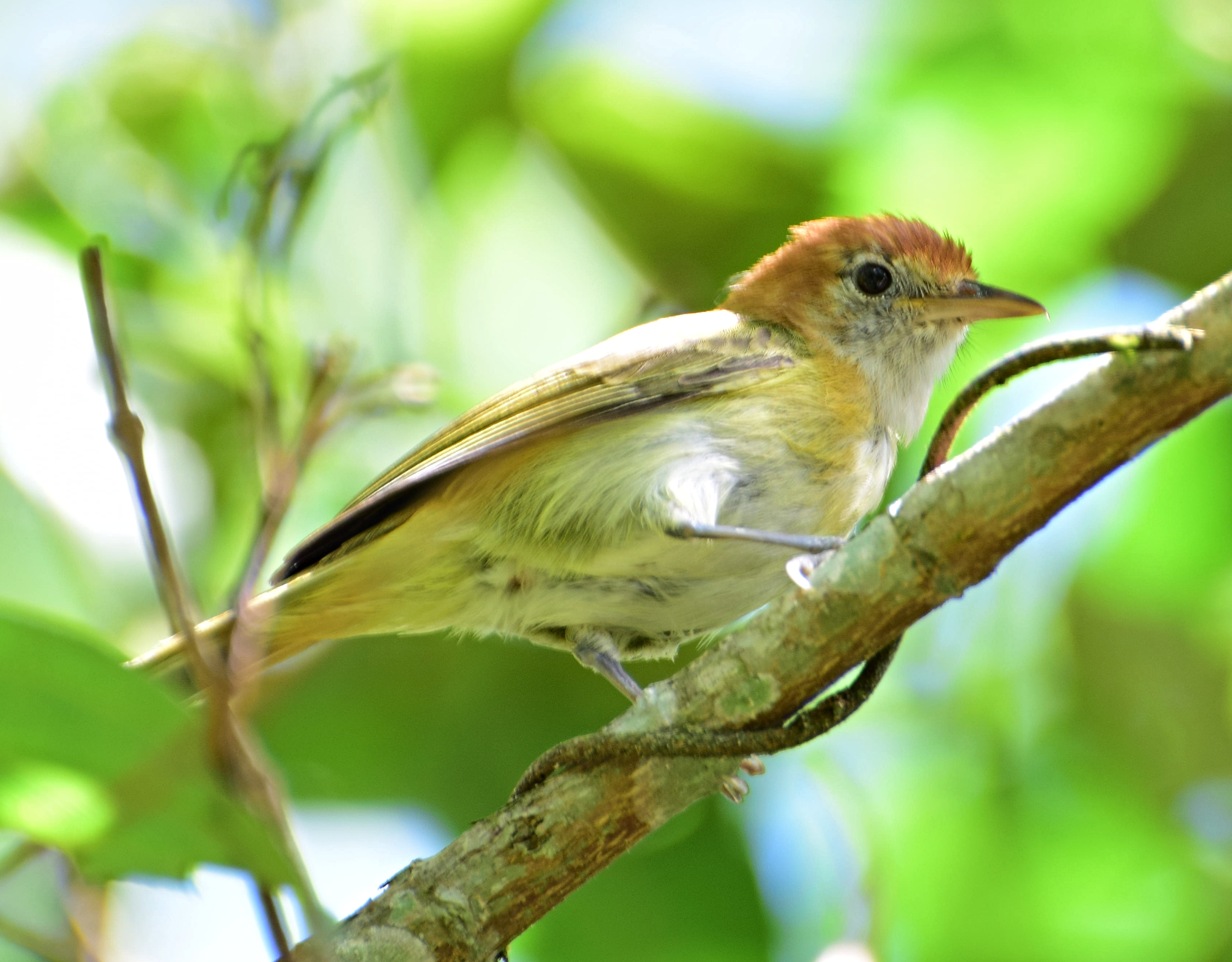

Conservation status
- Least Concern (IUCN 3.1)

Scientific classification
- Kingdom: Animalia
- Phylum: Chordata
- Class: Aves
- Order: Passeriformes
- Family: Vireonidae
- Genus: Pachysylvia
- Species: P. semibrunnea

Binomial name
- Pachysylvia semibrunnea (Lafresnaye, 1845)

Synonyms
- Hylophilus semi-brunneus

= Rufous-naped greenlet =

Species of bird

The rufous-naped greenlet (Pachysylvia semibrunnea) is a species of bird in the family Vireonidae, the vireos, greenlets, and shrike-babblers. It is found in Colombia, Ecuador, and Venezuela.

== Taxonomy and systematics ==
The rufous-naped greenlet was originally described in 1845 as Hylophilus semi-brunneus.

The rufous-naped greenlet is monotypic. In the early twentieth century it was treated as a subspecies of the golden-fronted greenlet (P. aurantiifrons). The two are sister species and form a superspecies.

== Description ==
The rufous-naped greenlet is 12 to 13 cm (4.7 to 5.1 in) long and weighs about 10 to 12.5 g (0.35 to 0.44 oz). The sexes have the same plumage. Adults have a rich rufous crown, nape, and ear coverts. Their lores, the area around their eyes, and their "moustache" are grizzled grayish white. Their upperparts are olive-green. Their wings' coverts are olive-green with paler edges. Their flight feathers and tail are dusky green with olive-green edges. Their throat is whitish, their breast is yellowish white with a rufous-tinged band on its upper part, and their belly, flanks, vent, and undertail coverts are pale yellowish. They have a dark iris, a pink bill, and leaden blue legs and feet.

== Distribution and habitat ==
The rufous-naped greenlet has a disjunct distribution. It is found in the Serranía del Perijá on the Colombia/Venezuela border and a bit east into Zulia from there. It is found intermittently along all three ranges of the Colombian Andes though mostly in the eastern range. Its range also includes sites in northern Ecuador's Napo Province. The rufous-naped greenlet inhabits the interior and edges of primary and secondary forest in the upper foothill and lower subtropical zones. It also occurs in shade coffee plantations. In elevation it ranges between 450 and 2,000 m (1,500 and 6,600 ft) in Venezuela, between 1,000 and 2,800 m (3,300 and 9,200 ft) in Colombia, and between 900 and 1,400 m (3,000 and 4,600 ft) in Ecuador.

== Behavior ==
=== Movement ===
The rufous-naped greenlet is believed to be a year-round resident.

=== Feeding ===
The rufous-naped greenlet's diet has not been fully examined but is known to include insects. It feeds actively from the forest's mid-story to its crown, often hanging upside-down to glean prey from leaves. It usually forages singly, in pairs, or in small family groups and frequently joins mixed-species feeding flocks. It has been observed attending army ant swarms.

=== Breeding ===
The rufous-naped greenlet's breeding season appears to span from February to July. Nothing else is known about the species' breeding biology.

=== Vocalization ===
One description of the rufous-naped greenlet's song is "a repeated, fast cheedodoweédidideét". Its call is "a descending series of 3-5 loud, harsh, scolding notes".

== Status ==
The IUCN has assessed the rufous-naped greenlet as being of Least Concern. It has a restricted range; its population size is not known and is believed to be stable. No immediate threats have been identified. It is known from "numerous specimens" in Venezuela, considered "fairly common" in Colombia, and is "uncommon and local" in Ecuador. The rufous-naped greenlet is found in a few protected areas and "has a medium sensitivity to human disturbance".
