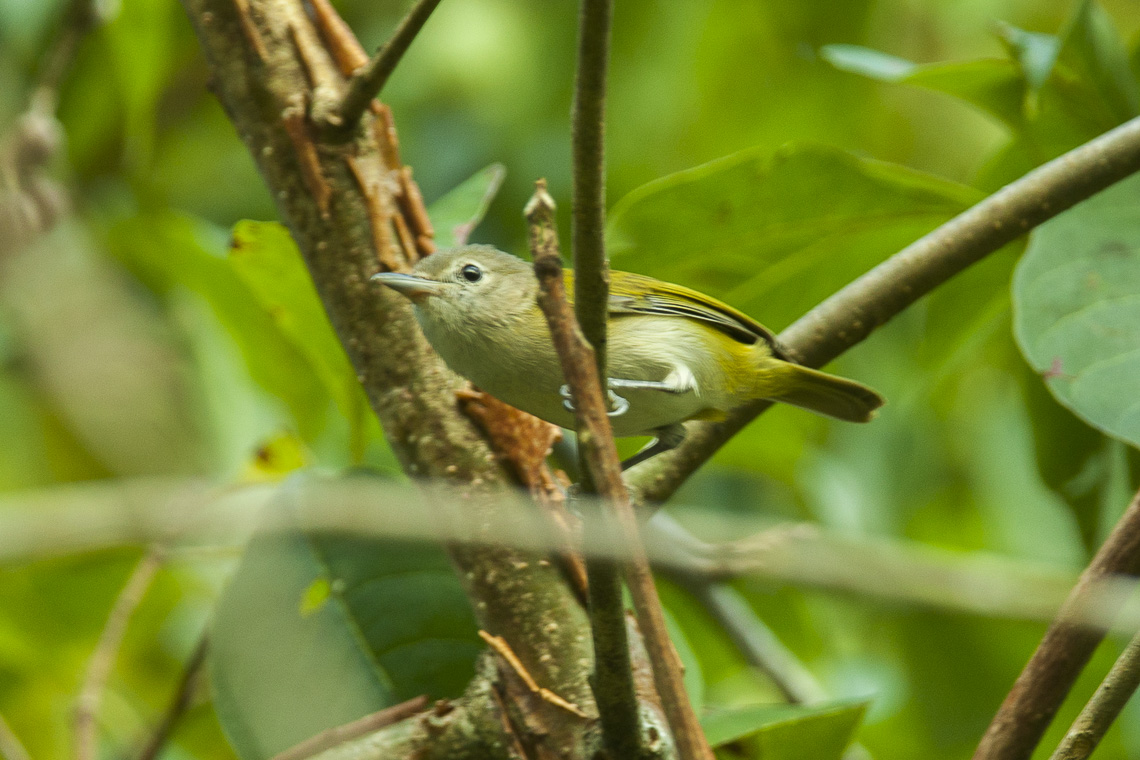

Conservation status
- Least Concern (IUCN 3.1)

Scientific classification
- Kingdom: Animalia
- Phylum: Chordata
- Class: Aves
- Order: Passeriformes
- Family: Vireonidae
- Genus: Pachysylvia
- Species: P. aurantiifrons

Binomial name
- Pachysylvia aurantiifrons (Lawrence, 1861)

Synonyms
- Hylophilus aurantiifrons

= Golden-fronted greenlet =

Species of bird

The golden-fronted greenlet (Pachysylvia aurantiifrons) is a small passerine bird in the family Vireonidae, the vireos, greenlets, and shrike-babblers. It is found in Panama, Colombia, Venezuela, and Trinidad.

== Taxonomy and systematics ==
The golden-fronted greenlet was originally described in 1861 as Hylophilus aurantiifrons.

The golden-fronted greenlet has three subspecies, the nominate P. a. aurantiifrons (Lawrence, 1861), P. a. helvina (Wetmore & Phelps, WH Jr, 1956), and P. a. saturata (Hellmayr, 1906). In the early twentieth century what is now the dusky-capped greenlet (P. hypoxantha) was also included as a subspecies. The golden-fronted and rufous-naped (P. semibrunnea) greenlets are sister species and form a superspecies.

== Description ==
The golden-fronted greenlet is 11 to 12 cm (4.3 to 4.7 in) long and weighs an average of 9.5 g (0.34 oz). The sexes have the same plumage. Adults of the nominate subspecies have an ochre-olive forehead and a buffy brown crown. Their upperparts are greenish brown that is more yellowish green on the rump. Their wings' coverts are greenish brown and their primaries and secondaries are dull blackish gray with thin greenish edges on the outer webs. Their tail is dull olive-green. Their chin and throat are whitish buff, their breast grayish yellow, and their belly and vent yellowish. Subspecies P. a. saturata has more brightly colored underparts than the nominate, with a stronger buffy or ochraceous wash on the breast. P. a. helvina has a dark reddish brown crown; its upper breast is darker, its flanks greener, and its undertail coverts darker yellow than the nominate's. All subspecies have a brown or black iris, a dusky horn maxilla, a pinkish mandible, and grayish brown or plumbeous legs and feet.

== Distribution and habitat ==
The nominate subspecies of the golden-fronted greenlet is found from Coclé Province in Panama east into northern Colombia. Subspecies P. a. helvina is found in northwestern Venezuela west of the Andes from Zulia east to southern Táchira and northern Mérida. P. a. saturata is found on Trinidad and from eastern Colombia across most of northern Venezuela. The species inhabits a variety of landscapes in the tropical zone including deciduous, gallery, and secondary forest, the edges of evergreen forest, dryer scrublands, and gardens. In elevation it ranges from sea level to 1,000 m (3,300 ft) in Colombia and to 1,900 m (6,200 ft) in Venezuela.

== Behavior ==
=== Movement ===
The golden-fronted greenlet is believed to be a sedentary year-round resident.

=== Feeding ===
The golden-fronted greenlet's diet has not been fully examined but is known to include insects and spiders. It feeds actively at all levels of the forest, often hanging upside-down to glean prey from leaves. It usually forages in pairs or small family groups and frequently joins mixed-species feeding flocks.

=== Breeding ===
The golden-fronted greenlet's breeding season has not been fully defined but spans at least from July to October on Trinidad and includes August in Colombia. The only known nests were on Trinidad. They were cups that both sexes built from leaves, stems, and grass. They were suspended in branch forks or vines between about 1.6 and 10 m (5 and 35 ft) above the ground. The clutch size was three eggs that are white with some brown spots. The incubation period and time to fledging are not known. The species' nest is often parasitised by the shiny cowbird (Molothrus bonariensis).

=== Vocalization ===
The golden-fronted greenlet's song is "a short, quick, semimusical de-wichy-de-whéter, often over and over". Its calls include a "double note, chee-vee, and [a] chattering or chirping note".

== Status ==
The IUCN has assessed the golden-fronted greenlet as being of Least Concern. It has a large range; its estimated population of at least 500,000 mature individuals is believed to be decreasing. No immediate threats have been identified. It is considered common in both Colombia and Venezuela. It "[a]ppears able to adapt to some man-modified habitats, e.g. gardens and plantations".
