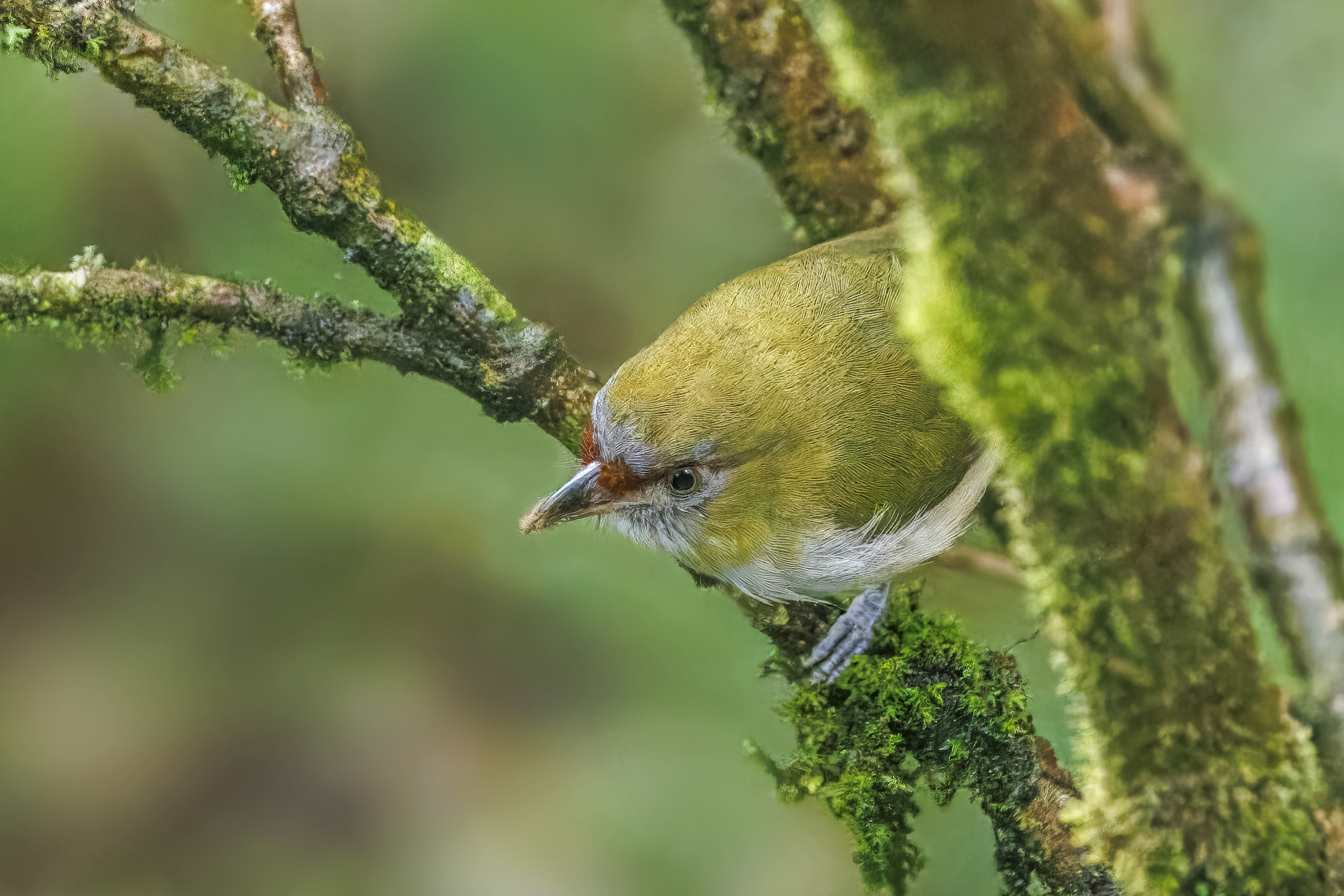

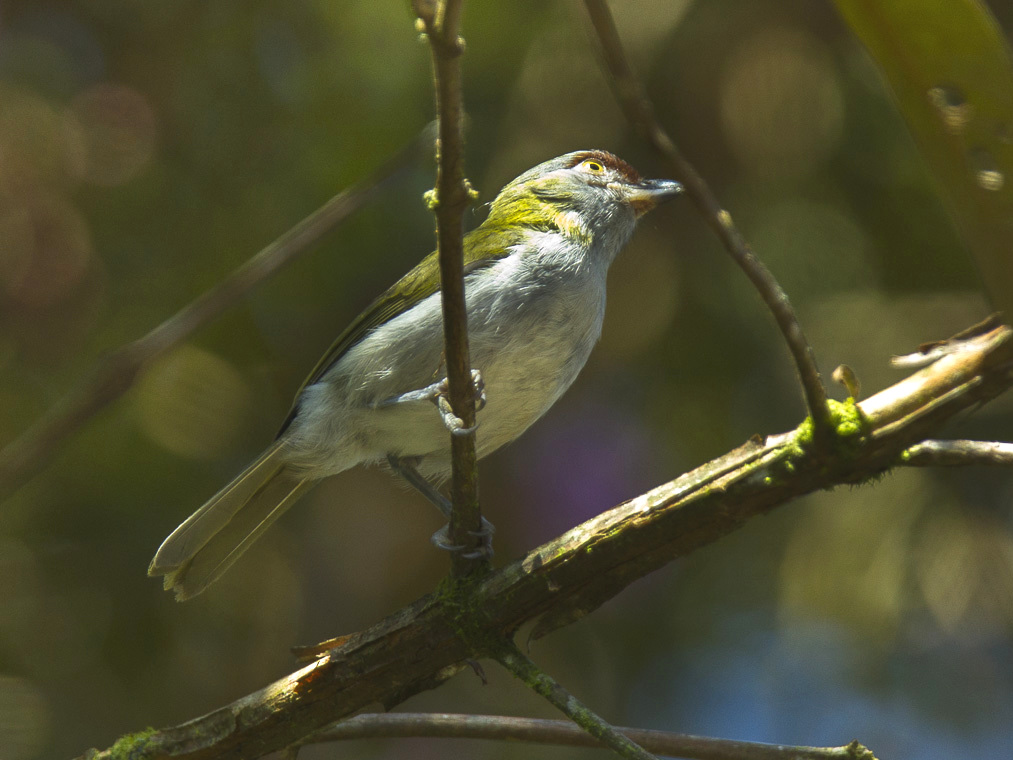

Conservation status
- Least Concern (IUCN 3.1)

Scientific classification
- Kingdom: Animalia
- Phylum: Chordata
- Class: Aves
- Order: Passeriformes
- Family: Vireonidae
- Genus: Cyclarhis
- Species: C. nigrirostris

Binomial name
- Cyclarhis nigrirostris Lafresnaye, 1842

= Black-billed peppershrike =

Species of bird

The black-billed peppershrike (Cyclarhis nigrirostris) is a species of bird in the family Vireonidae. It is found in the Andes of Colombia and northern Ecuador. It inhabits subtropical or tropical moist montane forests and heavily degraded former forest.

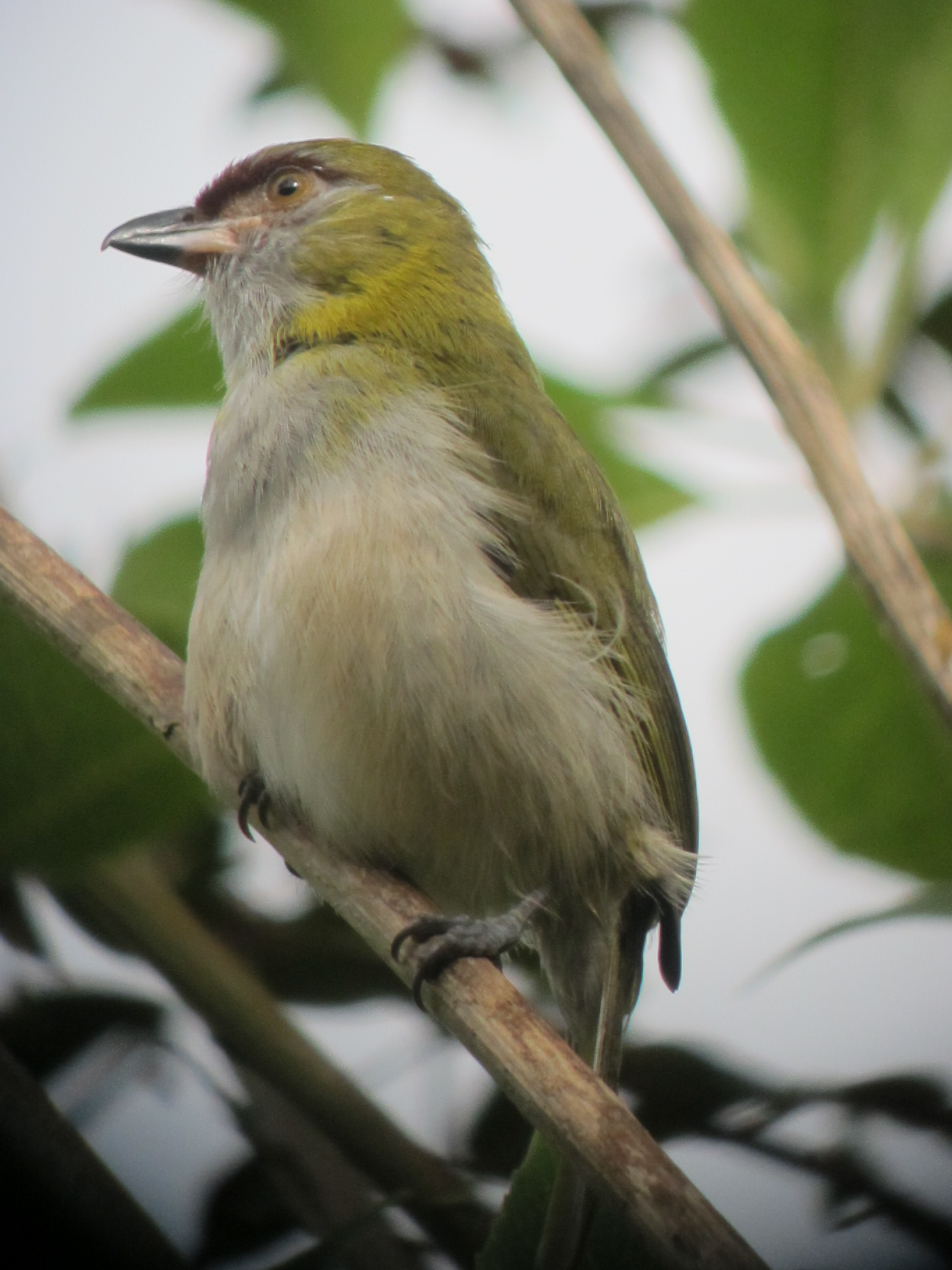
Black-billed peppershrike in Antioquia Department, Colombia

== Description ==
Olive coloured overall with grey throat, belly, cheek and forecrown and a rufous stripe above the eye and lore. Differs from the more common Rufous-browed peppershrike by its black-tipped bill, thinner rufous superciliary stripe, and olive neck and cap.

== Taxonomy ==
The black-billed peppershrike was described by Frédéric de Lafresnaye in 1842 as Cyclaris nigrirostris (sic) from a specimen collected in Bogotá. There are two recognised subspecies:

- Cyclaris nigrirostris nigrirostris Lafresnaye, 1842 – Colombia west of the East Andes as well as in Ecuador
- Cyclaris nigrirostric atrirostris Sclater, 1887 – West Andes of southern Colombia, further south into Pichincha Province, Ecuador

== Distribution ==
The black-billed peppershrike is found in the Andes of Colombia and Ecuador.

== Behaviour ==
Its diet consists entirely of arthropods which it searches for in the canopy and mid-levels of trees. Found alone or alongside its mate. Little is known about its nesting habits but they are assumed to be similar to the Rufous-browed peppershrike which has been observed nesting in trees seven feet from the ground, with nests constructed out of moss.
