= Birds Australia – Victoria =

Birds Australia Victoria (BA-VIC) was the Victorian regional group of Birds Australia.

BA-VIC was formed in 1982. Members of Birds Australia resident in Victoria were automatically members of BA-VIC. The quarterly newsletter was Vic Babbler. Activities provided for members include monthly meetings, a variety of excursions and campouts, bird surveys and conservation projects. Past Presidents include prominent ornithologists Tim Dolby and Margaret Cameron.

In 2009, in association with Allen & Unwin, BA-VIC published a new bird book, Where to See Birds in Victoria, edited by Tim Dolby, featuring the best places in Victoria for seeing birds. Despite being Australia's smallest mainland state, its varied landscapes provide habitat for more than 500 bird species.
