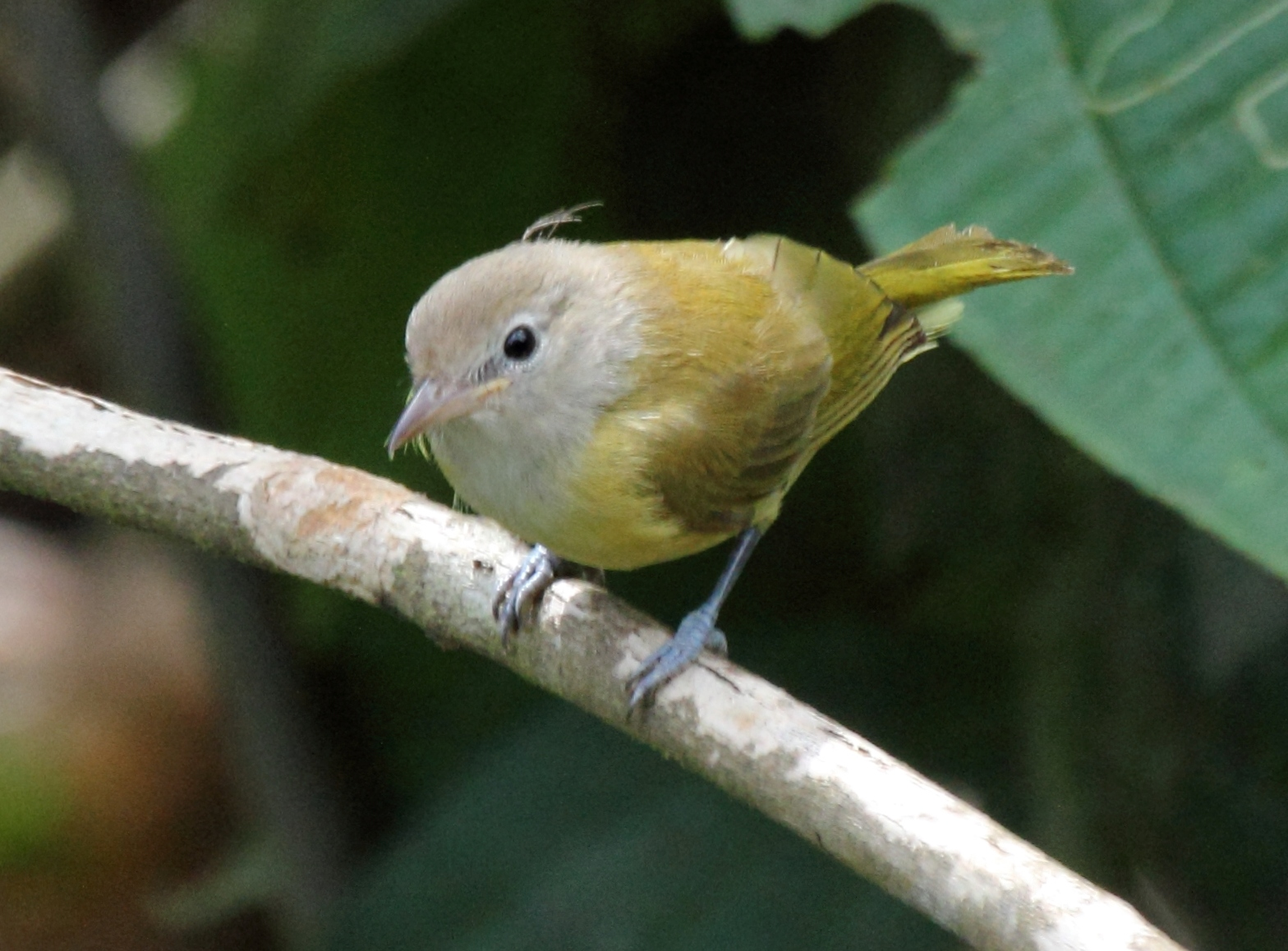
- Dusky-capped greenlet, Pachysylvia hypoxantha

Scientific classification
- Kingdom: Animalia
- Phylum: Chordata
- Class: Aves
- Order: Passeriformes
- Family: Vireonidae
- Genus: Pachysylvia; Bonaparte, 1850

Type species
- Pachysylvia decurtata

= Pachysylvia =

Genus of birds

Pachysylvia is a genus of bird in the family Vireonidae.

== Species ==
It contains the following species:

Image	Common name	Scientific name	Distribution
	Lesser greenlet	Pachysylvia decurtata	northeastern Mexico south to western Ecuador.
	Dusky-capped greenlet	Pachysylvia hypoxantha	Bolivia, Brazil, Colombia, Ecuador, Peru, and Venezuela.
	Buff-cheeked greenlet	Pachysylvia muscicapina	Bolivia, Brazil, French Guiana, Guyana, Suriname, and Venezuela.
	Golden-fronted greenlet	Pachysylvia aurantiifrons	Panama, Colombia, Venezuela and Trinidad.
	Rufous-naped greenlet	Pachysylvia semibrunnea	Colombia, northern Ecuador, and westernmost Venezuela.
