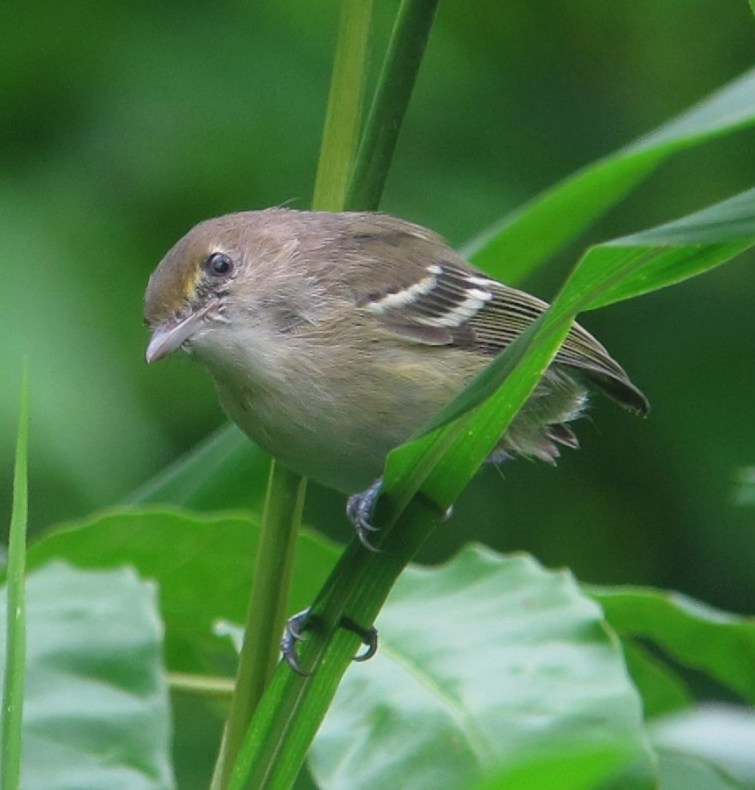

Conservation status
- Vulnerable (IUCN 3.1)

Scientific classification
- Kingdom: Animalia
- Phylum: Chordata
- Class: Aves
- Order: Passeriformes
- Family: Vireonidae
- Genus: Vireo
- Species: V. caribaeus

Binomial name
- Vireo caribaeus Bond & Meyer de Schauensee, 1942

= San Andres vireo =

Species of bird

The San Andres vireo or St. Andrew vireo (Vireo caribaeus) is a threatened species of vireo endemic to the Colombian island of San Andrés in the Caribbean, located off the east coast of Nicaragua. Due to habitat loss from the ever expanding population on these small islands, the species has now become limited to a few localities on the southern half of the island, but it is still common in some of these areas. It is found in most habitat types on the island.

== Description ==
It is a small bird, 12.5 cm in length. It is olive-green above and whitish or pale yellow below. It has two white bars on the wing, pale edges to the flight-feathers and a pale yellow stripe between the bill and eye. The eye is grey-brown. It has several songs and calls, producing a one-syllable chattering, a repeated two-syllable song and a three-syllable song.

It is very similar to the mangrove vireo (V. pallens) and Jamaican vireo (V. modestus). It has a slightly thinner and darker bill than the mangrove vireo. Its bill is slightly longer and darker than that of the Jamaican vireo which also differs in having a whitish eye and fainter stripe between the bill and eye.

== Distribution and habitat ==
It is restricted to the islands of St. Andrew (or San Andrés) and Providencia in the south-west Caribbean which belong to Colombia but is closer to Nicaragua. It occurs in a variety of habitats including woodland, cocoa plantations, scrubby pastures and mangrove swamps. It prefers vegetation with a dense understorey. It is most common in the less urbanized south of the island. The population has been estimated at between 8,200 and 14,000 individuals.

The bird has a very small range and may be vulnerable to the effects of hurricanes. It is threatened by habitat loss as the island's population increases. However, it is tolerant of habitat degradation and is still one of the island's commonest birds. It is classified as Vulnerable by BirdLife International.

== Behaviour ==
It feeds by gleaning caterpillars and other arthropods from vegetation. The breeding territory covers about 0.5 hectares and nesting has been recorded in June. The nest is built on or hanging from a branch in bushes or mangroves. Two lightly spotted eggs are laid.
