= Matteo Botteri =

Italian ornithologist (1808–1877)

Matteo Botteri (1808 – 1877), also known as Matija Botteri, was a botanist, ornithologist, and collector.

== Biography ==
Botteri was born on the island Hvar to an Italian family. He began his early career in Dalmatia and nearby areas in the Ottoman Empire with flora and fauna, primarily ichthyologist investigations, while headquartered in Hvar. He, along with his contemporary Grgur Bučić, sent materials to Georg von Frauenfeld for his studies. He also sent material to Friedrich Kützing. In 1854, he travelled to Mexico to collect plants on behalf of the Royal Horticultural Society. He settled in Orizaba, where he founded a museum and became professor of languages and natural history at Orizaba College.

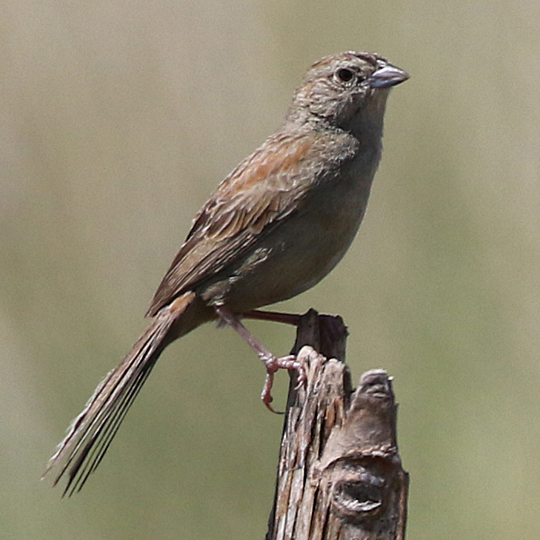
Botteri's sparrow

Philip Sclater commemorated him in the name of the Botteri's sparrow, which Botteri collected as well as other birds in Veracruz in 1857. He amassed a collection of 120 unique bird species in the vicinity of Orizaba, including areas such as Tuxpango, Tehuipango. His keeping of slaty vireo brought attention as its green color stood out among its genus.

He died in Orizaba in 1877.

== Bibliography ==
- Beolens, Bo (2014). The Eponym Dictionary of Birds. London. ISBN 978-1472905734.
- Dulčić, Jakov (2010). "Ihtiološki doprinosi hvarskih prirodoslovaca Luigija Stalija, Matije Botterija i Grgura Bučića tijekom 19. stoljeća". Prirodoslovlje: časopis Odjela za prirodoslovlje i matematiku Matice hrvatske (in Croatian). 10 (1–2): 107–116.
- Durbešić, Paula (22 December 2011). "CROATIAN ENTOMOFAUNA – Looking Back from the Present and Future Plans". Entomologia Croatica. 15 (1–4): 17–101. ISSN 1330-6200.
- Fischer, Dan L. (2001). "West of the 95th Meridian". Early Southwest Ornithologists, 1528-1900. University of Arizona Press. pp. 131–164. ISBN 978-0-8165-2149-4. JSTOR j.ctv21wj56r.12.
- Hooker, William Jackson (1853). Hooker's Journal of Botany and Kew Garden Miscellany (Report). Vol. 5. Reeve, Benham, and Reeve.
- Hughey, Jeffery R.; Gabrielson, Paul W.; Maggs, Christine A.; Mineur, Frédéric (2021). "Genomic analysis of the lectotype specimens of European Ulva rigida and Ulva lacinulata (Ulvaceae, Chlorophyta) reveals the ongoing misapplication of names". European Journal of Phycology. 57 (2): 143–153. doi:10.1080/09670262.2021.1914862. S2CID 236257717.
- Harper, Francis (1930). "A Historical Sketch of Botteri's Sparrow". The Auk. 47 (2): 177–185. doi:10.2307/4075920. ISSN 0004-8038. JSTOR 4075920.
- Loetscher, Frederick W.; Gullion, Gordon W.; Montgomery, Vester; Fisher, Harvey I.; Young, R. T.; Sibley, Charles G.; Childs, Henry E.; Mossman, Archie S.; Dixon, Keith L.; Stoner, Emerson A.; Wooten, William A. (1952). "From Field and Study". The Condor. 54 (4): 204–208. doi:10.2307/1364637. ISSN 0010-5422. JSTOR 1364637.
- Miller, Alden H.; Ray, Milton S. (1944). "Discovery of a New Vireo of the Genus Neochloe in Southwestern Mexico". The Condor. 46 (2): 41–45. doi:10.2307/1364304. ISSN 0010-5422. JSTOR 1364304.
- Sclater, Philip Lutley (January 1857). "On a Collection of Birds Made By Signor Matteo Botteri in the Vicinity of Orizaba in Southern Mexico". Proceedings of the Zoological Society of London. 25 (1): 210–215. doi:10.1111/j.1096-3642.1857.tb01227.x.
