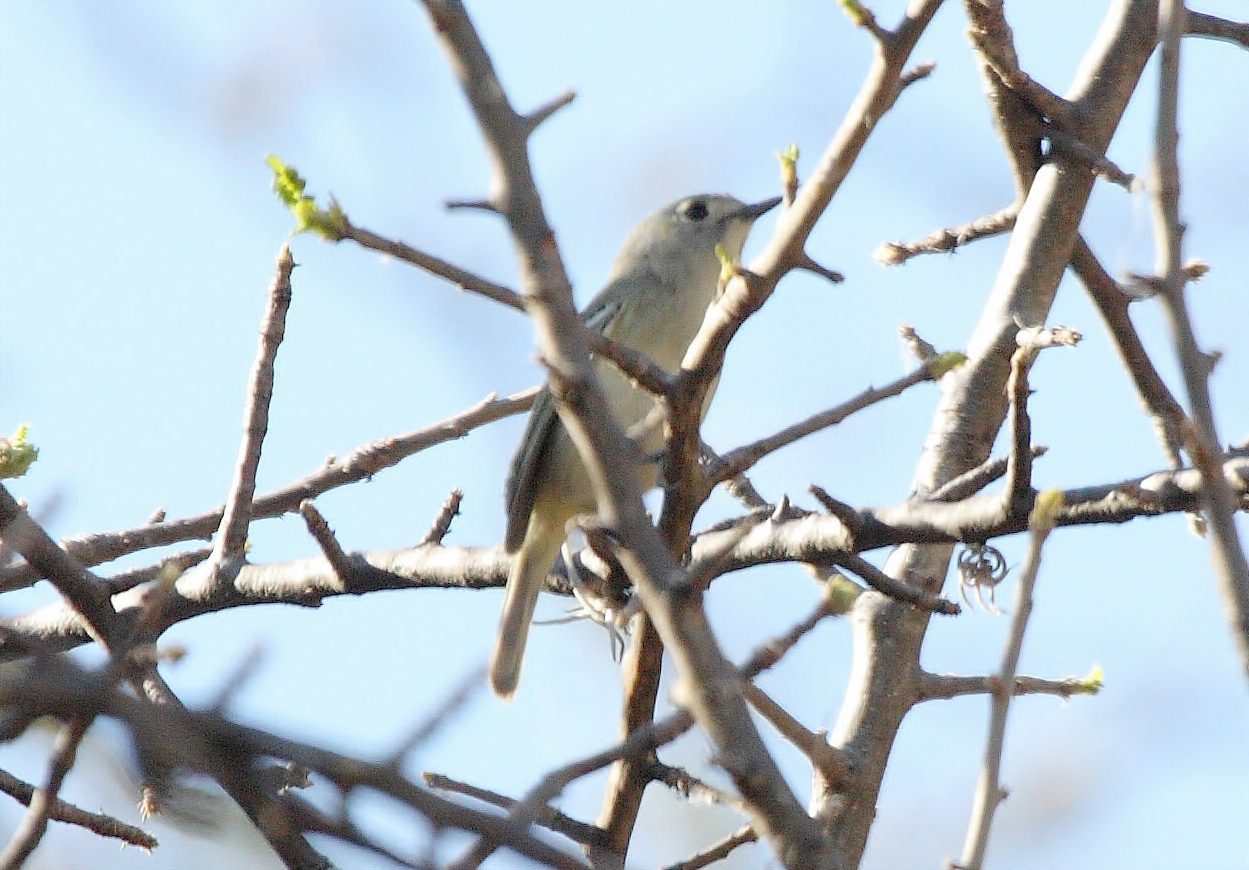

Conservation status
- Least Concern (IUCN 3.1)

Scientific classification
- Kingdom: Animalia
- Phylum: Chordata
- Class: Aves
- Order: Passeriformes
- Family: Vireonidae
- Genus: Vireo
- Species: V. nelsoni

Binomial name
- Vireo nelsoni Bond, 1934

= Dwarf vireo =

Species of bird

The dwarf vireo (Vireo nelsoni) is a species of bird in the family Vireonidae, the vireos, greenlets, and shrike-babblers. It is endemic to Mexico.

== Taxonomy and systematics ==
The dwarf vireo was originally described in 1898 as Vireo nanus, but in 1934 James Bond recognized that the binomial V. nanus had already been used for the flat-billed vireo. Bond coined the species' present binomial and is credited with the first valid naming.

The dwarf vireo is monotypic.

== Description ==
The dwarf vireo is 10 to 11 cm (3.9 to 4.3 in) long; two individuals weighed 9.2 and 9.4 g (0.32 and 0.33 oz). The sexes have similar plumage. Adult males have a bluish gray crown and adult females an olive crown. Both sexes have grayish white lores and a grayish white eye-ring with a gap above the eye on an otherwise grayish olive to olive face. Their upperparts are grayish olive to olive. Their wing coverts are dusky with grayish white tips that form two wing bars. Their flight feathers are dusky with pale olive gray edges. Their tail is dusky with pale yellowish olive green edges on the feathers. Their throat and underparts are white with a faint grayish wash on the breast. They have a reddish iris, a black or blackish bill, and blue-gray legs and feet.

== Distribution and habitat ==
The dwarf vireo is found inland in southwestern Mexico from Jalisco and southern Guerrero south to central Oaxaca. It inhabits dry (semi-arid to arid) scrublands that often have oaks. In elevation it ranges between 1,000 and 2,500 m (3,300 and 8,200 ft).

== Behavior ==
=== Movement ===
The dwarf vireo is a probably a year-round resident though a few authors have suggested seasonal elevational movements.

=== Feeding ===
The dwarf vireo's diet is not known though it is assumed to eat mostly arthropods and some fruit. It typically forages singly or in pairs and typically near the ground.

=== Breeding ===
The dwarf vireo's breeding season has not been detailed but is known to include June. Its nest has not been described beyond that it is placed at low to medium levels above the ground in a tree or bush. Nothing else is known about the species' breeding biology.

=== Vocalization ===
One description of the dwarf vireo's song is "rich to slightly scratchy, hurried warbling phrases, often prolonged, and short, scratchy, warbled phrases, whee chi-a-wee wee-chi, or wee ch'wee wee chir'-awee, or wi chee'r ch wit, etc.". Its calls include "a short, dry dri-dri-it or chi-chi chi-chi-chi,...a gnatcatcher Polioptila-like mewing meearr-meear, and a scolding cheh-cheh...or jeh-jeh-jehr".

== Status ==
The IUCN originally in 1994 assessed the dwarf vireo as Near Threatened and since 2000 as being of Least Concern. It has a large range; its estimated population of 20,000 to 50,000 mature individuals is believed to be decreasing. No immediate threats have been identified. Its abundance has been variously described as "very uncommon" and "uncommon to fairly common but local".
