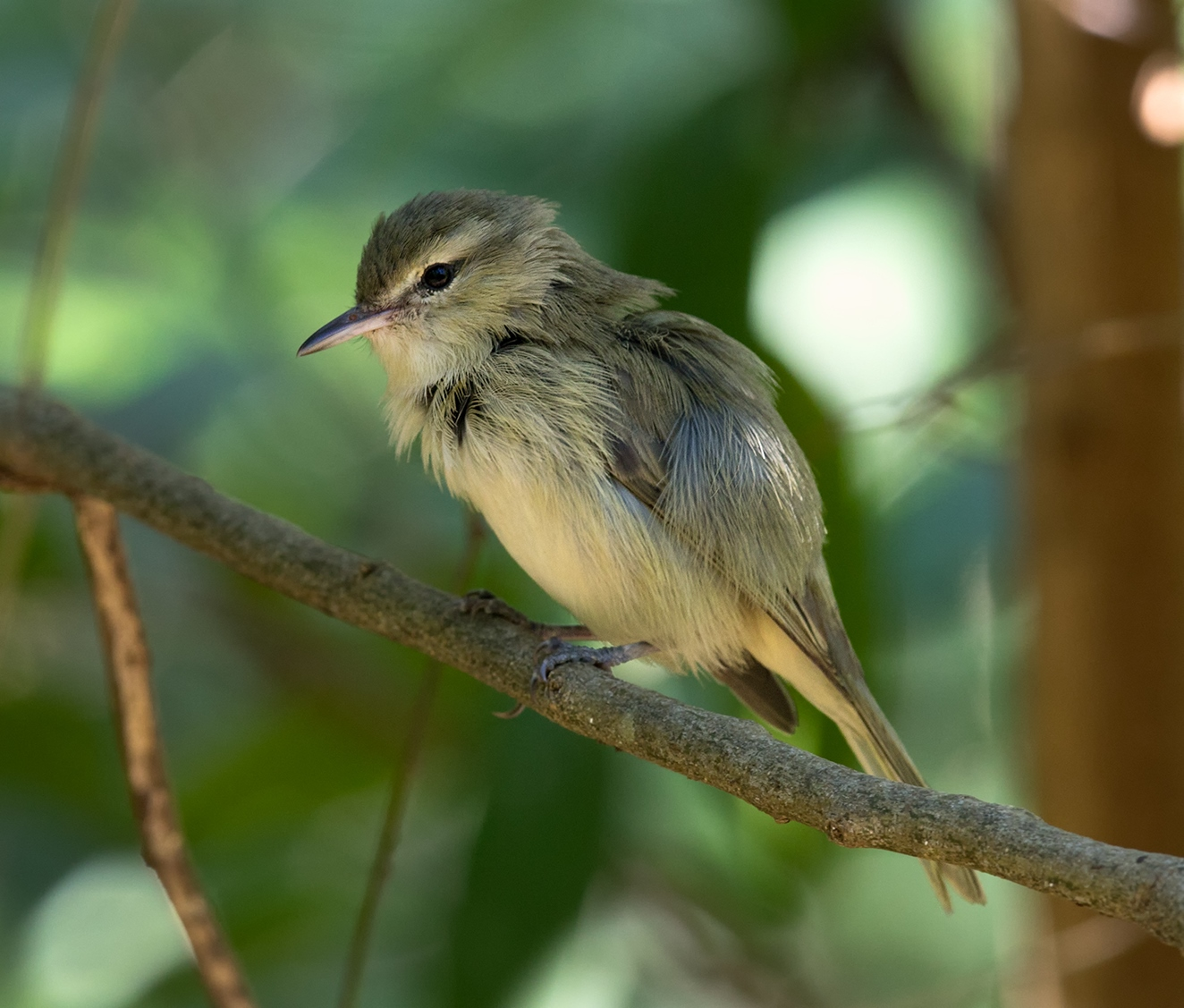

Conservation status
- Vulnerable (IUCN 3.1)

Scientific classification
- Kingdom: Animalia
- Phylum: Chordata
- Class: Aves
- Order: Passeriformes
- Family: Vireonidae
- Genus: Vireo
- Species: V. gracilirostris

Binomial name
- Vireo gracilirostris Sharpe, 1890
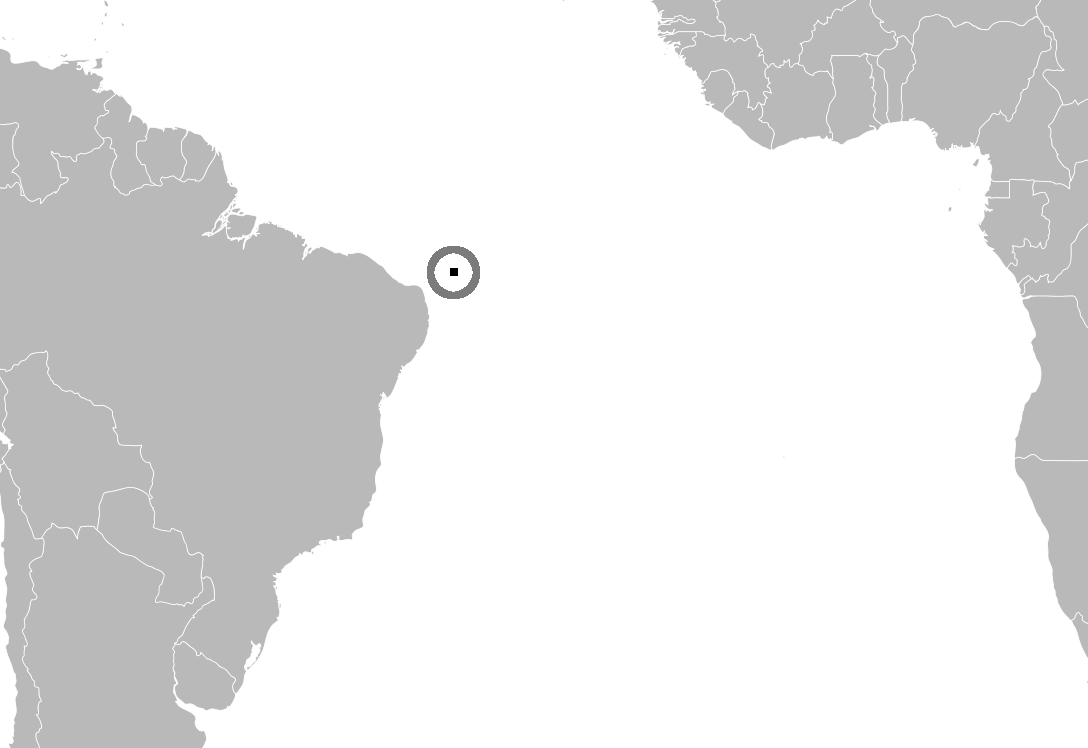

= Noronha vireo =

Species of bird endemic to Brazil

The Noronha vireo (Vireo gracilirostris) is a Vulnerable species of bird in the family Vireonidae, the vireos, greenlets, and shrike-babblers. It is endemic to the island of Fernando de Noronha, Brazil.

== Taxonomy and systematics ==
The Nornoha vireo was originally described in 1890 as Vireo gracilirostris, its present binomial. The author noted its strong similarity to the Yucatan vireo (V. magister). However, for part of the twentieth century it was treated as a subspecies of the chivi vireo group (V. chivi) within the red-eyed vireo (V. olivaceous sensu lato).

The Noronha vireo is monotypic.

== Description ==
The Noronha vireo is 14 cm (5.5 in) long and weighs 11.5 to 25.1 g (0.41 to 0.89 oz). The sexes have the same plumage. Adults have a buffy supercilium and brownish lores. Their crown, nape, and upperparts are dingy grayish olive that becomes more greenish on the lower back, rump, and tail. Their primaries and secondaries are grayish olive with greenish edges on the outer webs. Their throat and underparts are dull buffy whitish. They have a brownish iris, a brownish horn bill with a paler base to the mandible, and pale bluish gray legs and feet. Juveniles have a rich rusty brown crown and back.

== Distribution and habitat ==
The Noronha vireo is found only on Fernando de Noronha island, which is about 350 km (220 mi) off the coast of northeastern Brazil. It is the only vireo on the island and is found "[in] any habitat". These include forest, shrublands, and gardens. Primary forest has been almost entirely eliminated on the island so secondary forest remains.

== Behavior ==
=== Movement ===
The Noronha vireo is a sedentary year-round resident.

=== Feeding ===
The Noronha vireo feeds mainly on a variety of insects and also includes small fruits in its diet. It forages at all levels of its habitat. "In [the] absence of competing passerine species, [it] seems to have developed a wide variety of feeding techniques." These include often hanging upside-down to take prey from the undersides of leaves and flowers and to regularly take insects in mid-air.

=== Breeding ===
The Noronha vireo's breeding season has not been fully defined but appears to span from May to October. Its nest is a cup built in a branch fork from leaves, plant fibers, rootlets, and spider web. Three nests were between about 2.5 and 6 m (10 and 20 ft) above the ground. The clutch size, incubation period, time to fledging, and details of parental care are not known.

=== Vocalization ===
The Noronha vireo's song is a "melodious weet a weet, chewegoo, whit, whit". Its alarm call is "tschrrr" and other calls include "a scolding harsh skeeur and a high thin whistle".

== Status ==
The IUCN originally in 1988 assessed the Noronha vireo as being of Least Concern, then in 1994 as Vulnerable, in 2000 as Near Threatened, and in 2024 again as Vulnerable. It has a very restricted range and its estimated population of between 700 and 1000 mature individuals is believed to be decreasing. Only secondary forest remains on the island, and it is under threat primarily by the expansion of facilities for tourism. Introduced cats and rats are significant predators on the species. It is "still very common, with high densities in forested areas, and persists in secondary growth".
