= Brickellia botterii =

Scientific classification
- Kingdom: Plantae
- Clade: Tracheophytes
- Clade: Angiosperms
- Clade: Eudicots
- Clade: Asterids
- Order: Asterales
- Family: Asteraceae
- Genus: Brickellia
- Species: B. botterii

Binomial name
- Brickellia botterii (B.L.Rob.) S.F.Blake

Synonyms
- Coleosanthus botterii (B.L.Rob.) S.F.Blake

Species of flowering plant

Brickellia botterii is a Mexican species of flowering plants in the family Asteraceae. It is native to the state of Veracruz on the coast of the Gulf of Mexico.

The species is named for Italian ornithologist Matteo Botteri (1808 – 1877).
