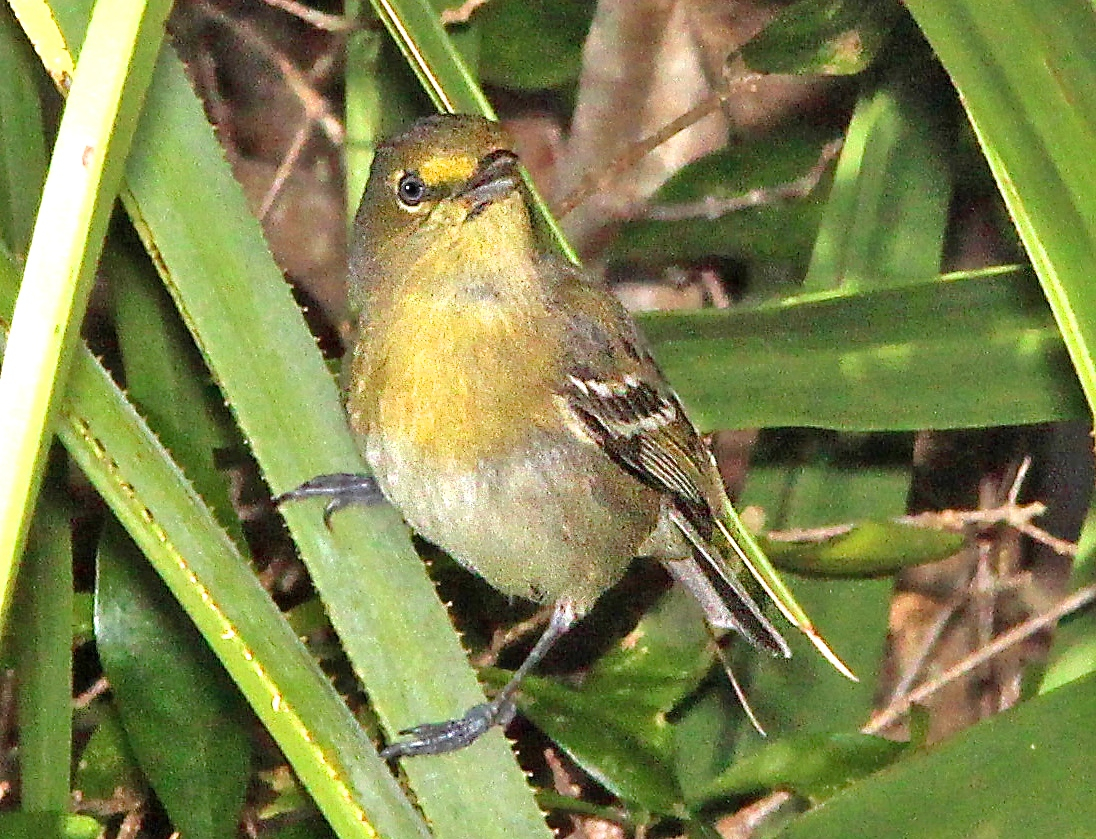

Conservation status
- Least Concern (IUCN 3.1)

Scientific classification
- Kingdom: Animalia
- Phylum: Chordata
- Class: Aves
- Order: Passeriformes
- Family: Vireonidae
- Genus: Vireo
- Species: V. crassirostris

Binomial name
- Vireo crassirostris (Bryant, H, 1859)

= Thick-billed vireo =

Species of bird

The thick-billed vireo (Vireo crassirostris) is a species of bird in the family Vireonidae, the vireos, greenlets, and shrike-babblers. It is found on many islands of the West Indies and as an occasional vagrant to south Florida in the United States.

== Taxonomy and systematics ==
The thick-billed vireo was originally described in 1859 as Lanivireo crassirostris.

The thick-billed vireo has these five subspecies:

- V. c. crassirostris (Bryant, H, 1859)
- V. c. stalagmium Buden, 1985
- V. c. tortugae Richmond, 1917
- V. c. cubensis Kirkconnell & Garrido, 2000
- V. c. alleni Cory, 1886

What is now a subspecies of the mangrove vireo (V. pallens approximans), found on Isla de Providencia and Isla Santa Catalina off the east coast of Nicaragua, was originally described as a species and then assigned to the thick-billed vireo as a subspecies. Taxonomic systems began transferring it from the thick-billed vireo to the mangrove in the late 2010s.

In the early twentieth century V. c. crassirostris had been treated as two subspecies; they were later merged.

== Description ==
The thick-billed vireo is 11.5 to 13.4 cm (4.5 to 5.3 in) long and weighs about 11 to 16 g (0.39 to 0.56 oz). The sexes have the same plumage. Adults of the nominate subspecies V. c. crassirostris have a mostly grayish olive to brownish olive crown, face, and nape with blackish lores, a pale yellow stripe above the lores, and a pale to darker yellow eye-ring that sometimes is incomplete. Their upperparts are grayish olive to brownish olive with a more olive-green rump and uppertail coverts. Their wing coverts are dusky grayish brown with wide white tips that form two prominent wing bars. Their flight feathers are dusky grayish brown; the primaries have off-white edges, the secondaries have pale olive edges, and the tertials have white edges. Their tail is dusky grayish brown. Their underparts are pale grayish buffy to light yellowish buff or yellow. The other subspecies of the thick-billed vireo differ very little from the nominate. All subspecies have a dark iris, a dusky horn maxilla, a pale horn mandible, and bluish gray legs and feet.

== Distribution and habitat ==
The subspecies of the thick-billed vireo are found thus:

- V. c. crassirostris: the Bahamas
- V. c. stalagmium: the Turks and Caicos Islands
- V. c. tortugae: Île de la Tortue off northern Haiti
- V. c. cubensis: Cayo Coco and Cayo Paredón Grande off northern Cuba
- V. c. alleni: the Cayman Islands

The species has also been recorded several times in Florida.

The thick-billed vireo inhabits deciduous woodlands, scrublands, and mangroves.

== Behavior ==
=== Movement ===
The thick-billed vireo is primarily a year-round resident. However, it is an "[u]ncommon migrant to coastal north-central Cuba in October".

=== Feeding ===
The thick-billed vireo feeds primarily on arthropods but also includes some fruit in its diet. It forages at all levels of its habitat taking food by gleaning from leaves and branches.

=== Breeding ===
The thick-billed vireo's breeding season has not been defined but includes May to July. Its nest is a cup made from plant fibers and spider web lined with grasses and attached to a branch or in a fork. Clutches of two and three eggs have been found; the eggs are white with dark spots. The incubation period is not known but both parents are known to incubate. The time to fledging and other details of parental care are not known.

=== Vocalization ===
The thick-billed vireo's song is a "[b]ubbly, variable chik-didle-wer-chip". Only males sing.

== Status ==
The IUCN has assessed the thick-billed vireo as being of Least Concern. It has a small range; its population size is not known but is believed to be stable. No immediate threats have been identified.
