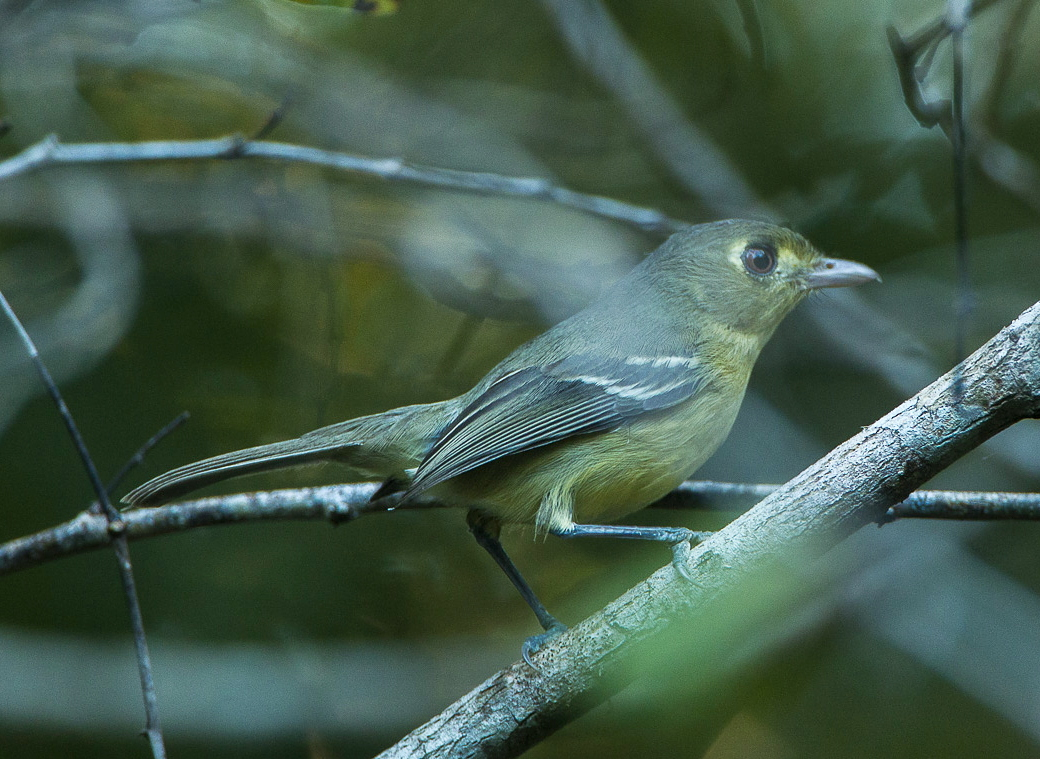

Conservation status
- Least Concern (IUCN 3.1)

Scientific classification
- Kingdom: Animalia
- Phylum: Chordata
- Class: Aves
- Order: Passeriformes
- Family: Vireonidae
- Genus: Vireo
- Species: V. gundlachii

Binomial name
- Vireo gundlachii Lembeye, 1850

= Cuban vireo =

Species of bird

The Cuban vireo (Vireo gundlachii) is a species of bird in the family Vireonidae, the vireos, greenlets, and shrike-babblers. It is endemic to Cuba.

== Taxonomy and systematics ==
The Cuban vireo was originally described in 1850 as Vireo gundlachii, its current binomial. At the time it had several local names including "Petit-bobo", "Juanchiví", and "Ojone". Its specific epithet honors Cuban zoologist Juan Gundlach. Some authors have treated it as a subspecies of the white-eyed vireo (V. griseus).

The Cuban vireo's further taxonomy is unsettled. The IOC, AviList, and BirdLife International's Handbook of the Birds of the World assign it these four subspecies:

- V. g. magnus Garrido, 1971
- V. g. sanfelipensis Garrido, 1973
- V. g. gundlachii Lembeye, 1850
- V. g. orientalis Todd, 1916

However, the Clements taxonomy treats it as monotypic.

This article follows the four-subspecies model.

== Description ==
The Cuban vireo is about 13 cm (5.1 in) long and weighs about 11 to 15 g (0.39 to 0.53 oz). The sexes have the same plumage. Adults of the nominate subspecies V. g. gundlachii have an olive-gray crown, nape, and ear coverts. They have a yellow or creamy white patch from lores through the eye and a grayish yellow area from the bill to the ear coverts. Their upperparts are olive-gray. Their wing coverts are brownish gray with small whitish or pale grayish tips that form two faint wing bars. Their flight feathers are brownish gray; the primaries and secondaries have pale yellowish edges on the outer webs. Their tail is brownish gray. Their throat and breast are yellowish, their belly and vent a paler yellowish, their sides a grayer yellowish, and their undertail coverts yellow gray. They have a brown or reddish brown iris, a gray-brown maxilla, a paler mandible, and lead gray legs and feet. Juveniles are overall duller than adults.

Subspecies V. g. magnus is larger than the nominate, with longer wings and tail, a less olivaceous back, and paler yellow underparts. V. g. sanfelipensis has a whitish (not yellow) chin and throat and paler underparts than the nominate. V. g. orientalis has grayer upperparts and paler underparts than the nominate.

== Distribution and habitat ==
The subspecies of the Cuban vireo are found thus:

- V. g. magnus: Cayo Cantiles, east of Isla de la Juventud (formerly the Isle of Pines)
- V. g. sanfelipensis: Cayo Real, in the Cayos de San Felipe west of Isla de la Juventud
- V. g. gundlachii: Cuba (including Isla de la Juventud) except for the southeast
- V. g. orientalis" southeastern Cuba

The Cuban vireo primarily inhabits the edges of evergreen and deciduous forest, brushlands, thickets, and scrublands from sea level up to about 700 m (2,300 ft) but also occurs higher.

== Behavior ==
=== Movement ===
The Cuban vireo is a year-round resident.

=== Feeding ===
The Cuban vireo feeds on insects, fruits, and small lizards. It mostly forages in pairs and frequently joins mixed-species feeding flocks. It typically forages in low vegetation.

=== Breeding ===
The Cuban vireo breeds between March and August with most activity between April and June. Its nest is a cup made from plant fibers, mosses, animal fur and hair, and other rather soft materials; it hangs by its rim in a thin branch's fork and is usually well concealed. The clutch is three eggs that are white with small brown or purplish spots. The incubation period, time to fledging, and details of parental care are not known.

=== Vocalization ===
The Cuban vireo's song is a "[h]igh, oft-repeated wi-chiví, wi-chiví, wi-chiví...". It also makes "a rapid descending series of chi notes, a scolding kik, a soft rattling call, and in spring courtship, a rapid repeated wheet".

== Status ==
The IUCN has assessed the Cuban vireo as being of Least Concern. It has a large range; its population size is not known but is believed to be stable. No immediate threats have been identified. It is considered "common and widespread". Because subspecies V. g. magnus and V. g. sanfelipensis have very small ranges they "could be vulnerable to violent meteorological events, especially hurricanes".
