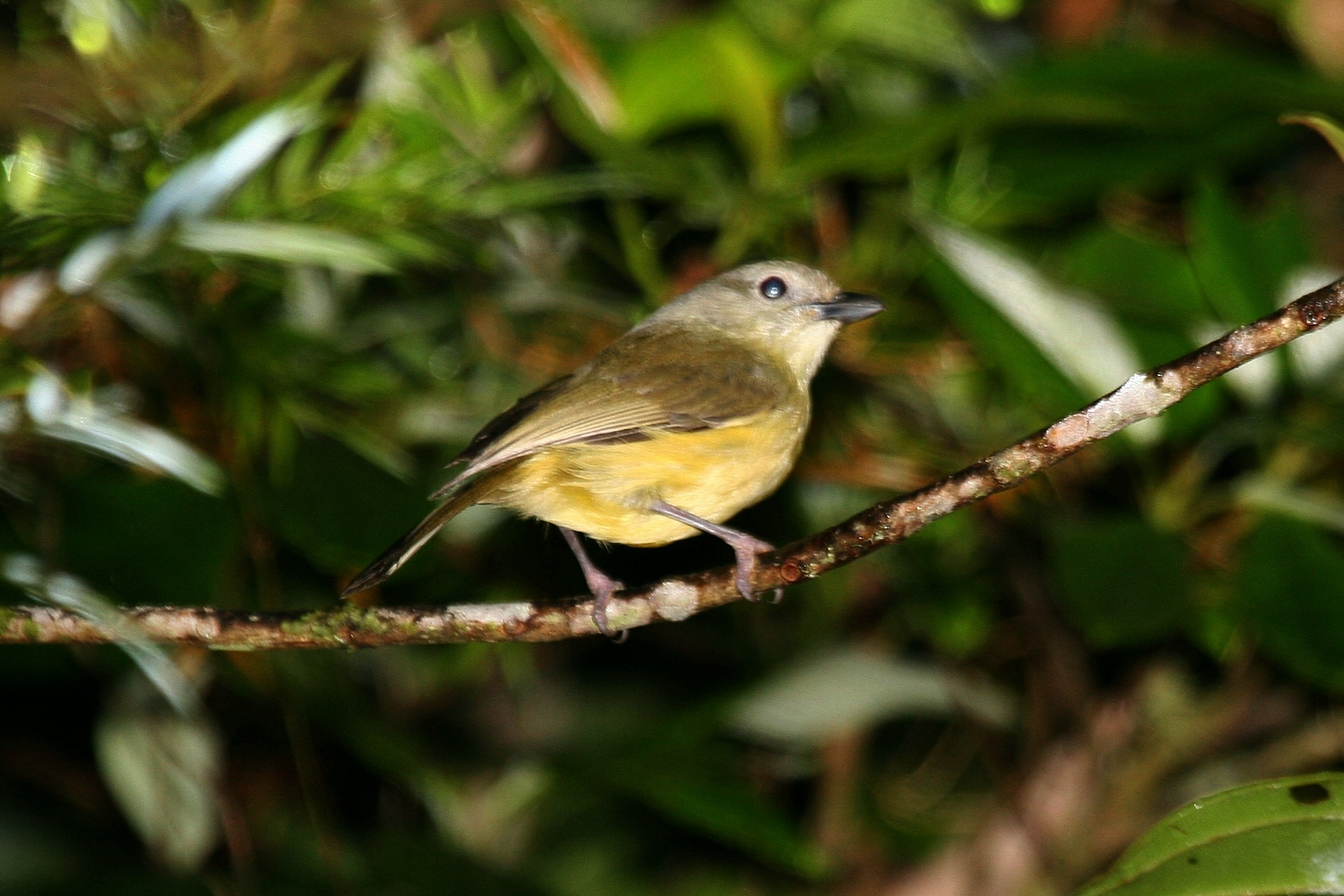

Conservation status
- Near Threatened (IUCN 3.1)

Scientific classification
- Kingdom: Animalia
- Phylum: Chordata
- Class: Aves
- Order: Passeriformes
- Family: Vireonidae
- Genus: Vireo
- Species: V. osburni

Binomial name
- Vireo osburni (PL Sclater, 1861)

= Blue Mountain vireo =

Species of bird

The Blue Mountain vireo (Vireo osburni) is a Near Threatened species of bird in the family Vireonidae, the vireos, greenlets, and shrike-babblers. It is endemic to Jamaica.

== Taxonomy and systematics ==
The Blue Mountain vireo was originally described in 1861 as Laletes osburni. Its specific epithet honors Mr. W. Osburn, who collected the type specimen.

The Blue Mountain vireo is monotypic.

== Description ==
The Blue Mountain vireo is 12.5 to 15 cm (4.9 to 5.9 in) long and weighs about 20 to 22 g (0.71 to 0.78 oz). This is a rather robust vireo. The sexes have the same plumage. Adults have a mostly gray-brown head with a plain face and yellow-tinged off-white chin and throat. Their upperparts are gray-brown with an olive tinge from the middle of the back to the rump. Their primaries and secondaries are gray-brown with grayish green edges on the outer webs. Their rectrices are gray-brown with greenish edges on the outer webs. Their upper breast is mottled yellowish and grayish brown, their lower breast and belly yellowish white with faint grayish mottling, their flanks brighter yellow, and their vent yellowish white. They have a brown iris, a heavy bill with a blackish maxilla and a lighter mandible, and gray legs and feet. Juveniles have yellow only on their lowermost underparts.

== Distribution and habitat ==
The Blue Mountain vireo is found across the island country of Jamaica. It primarily inhabits moist to humid montane forest on limestone but also upland woodlands, shade coffee plantations, and gardens. However, it is found in the last three only when they are near the preferred montane forest. Sources differ on its elevation range. One states it is "from 100 m upwards", another gives an elevational range of 600 to 2,000 m (2,000 to 6,600 ft), and a third gives a range of 500 to 2,200 m (1,600 to 7,200 ft).

== Behavior ==
=== Movement ===
The Blue Mountain vireo is a sedentary year-round resident.

=== Feeding ===
The Blue Mountain vireo feeds on insects and fruits, though details are lacking. It typically forages singly in dense foliage.

=== Breeding ===
The Blue Mountain vireo breeds mostly between March and July. Its nest is a cup dangling from a tree or sapling branch. Nothing else is known about the species' breeding biology.

=== Vocalization ===
The Blue Mountain vireo's song is a "[t]rilling or bubbling whistle, descending slightly in tone" and its call a "harsh burr, descending at end".

== Status ==
The IUCN has assessed the Blue Mountain vireo as Near Threatened. It has a small area of occupancy estimated at 1,900 km^{2} (730 sq mi) within its overall range of 13,500 km^{2} (5,200 sq mi). Its population size is not known and is believed to be decreasing. "Widespread habitat destruction has resulted in significant range contractions. Habitat loss has been primarily caused by the establishment of plantations (mostly coffee and Caribbean pine Pinus caribaea), the logging of trees for charcoal-burning, fires, small-scale farming and clearance for development." It is considered uncommon. It is found in Blue and John Crow Mountains National Park and the Cockpit Country "where rugged limestone terrain protects large areas of suitable habitat".
