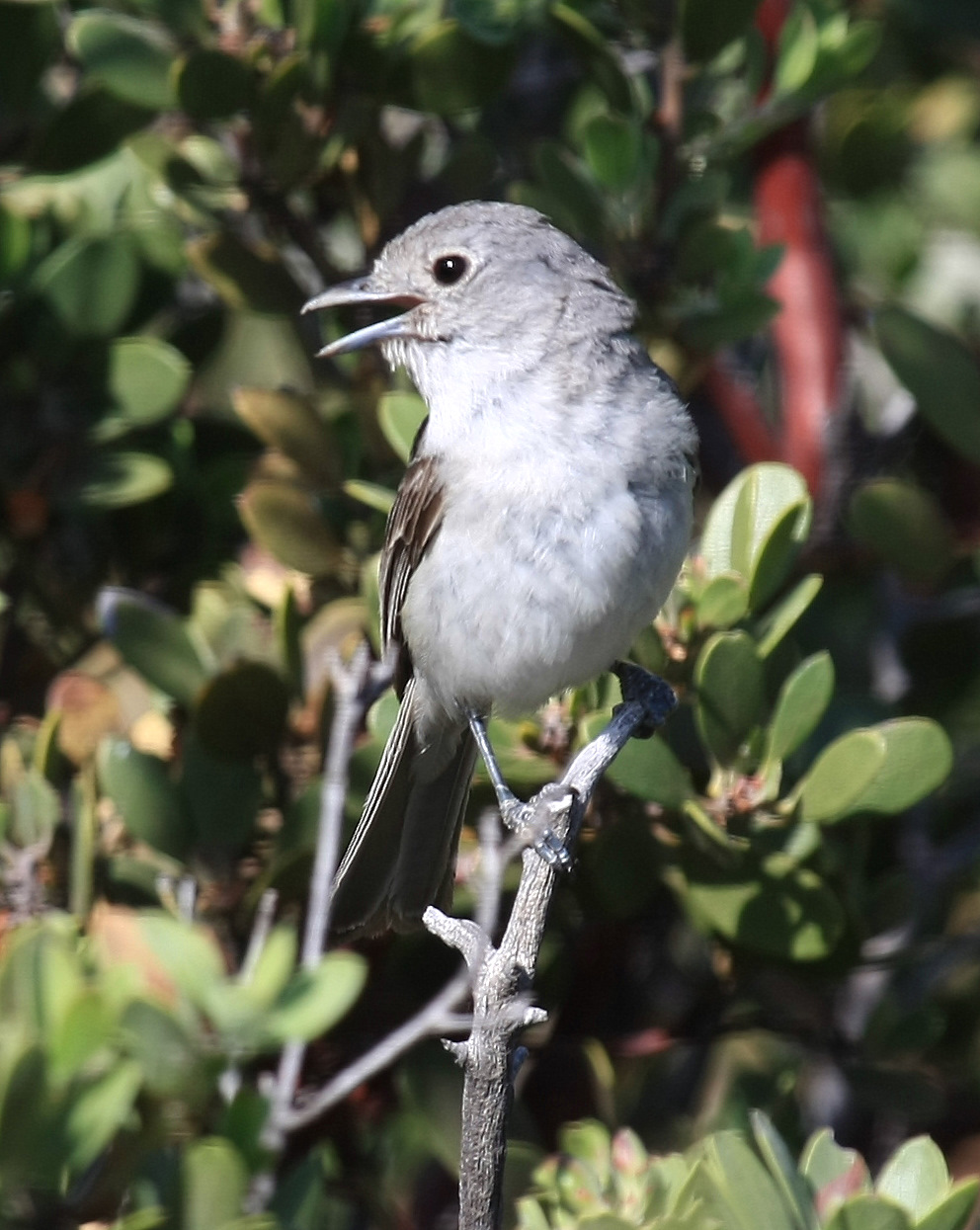

Conservation status
- Least Concern (IUCN 3.1)

Scientific classification
- Kingdom: Animalia
- Phylum: Chordata
- Class: Aves
- Order: Passeriformes
- Family: Vireonidae
- Genus: Vireo
- Species: V. vicinior

Binomial name
- Vireo vicinior Coues, 1866

= Gray vireo =

Species of bird

The gray vireo (Vireo vicinior) is a small North American passerine bird in the family Vireonidae, the vireos, greenlets, and shrike-babblers. It is found in the southwestern United States and northern Mexico.

== Taxonomy and systematics ==
The gray vireo was originally described in 1866 as Vireo vicinior, its current binomial.

The gray vireo is monotypic.

== Description ==
The gray vireo is about 13 to 15 cm (5.1 to 5.9 in) long and weighs 11.5 to 13.5 g (0.41 to 0.48 oz). The sexes have the same plumage. Adults have a mostly gray crown and face with white lores and a thin white eye-ring. Their upperparts are gray that gains a greenish cast late in the year. Their wings are mostly dark gray to blackish with white tips on the greater coverts that form a wing bar. Their tail is gray with white edges on the outer webs of the outer feathers. Their chin, throat, and upper breast are a paler gray than their upperparts; their belly and undertail coverts are white. They have a dark brown iris, a plumbeous or blackish maxilla, a paler grayish blue mandible, and plumbeous or blue-gray legs and feet.

== Distribution and habitat ==
The gray vireo has a disjunct distribution on both its breeding and wintering ranges. Its principal breeding range is in the southwestern United States in an area roughly bordered by far southeastern California, northeastern Utah and northwestern Colorado, central New Mexico, and southwestern New Mexico and southeastern Arizona. It also breeds in a few small areas in south-central California, southeastern Colorado, southeastern New Mexico, southwestern Texas, and northern Baja California. It winters in southern Baja California and from southwestern Arizona south through most of Mexico's Sonora state. It is present year-round in the Big Bend region of southwestern Texas. The species has also been documented as a vagrant in Kansas, Oklahoma, Wyoming, and Wisconsin.

The gray vireo year-round inhabits a variety of dry landscapes including oak-juniper and pinyon-juniper woodlands, chaparral, and thorn scrub. During migration and on its winter ranges it also inhabits arid and desert scrublands. In much of its breeding range it occurs in elevations between about 1,600 and 2,300 m (5,200 and 7,500 ft) though is found as low as 900 m (3,000 ft) in west Texas and 400 m (1,300 ft) in northern Mexico.

== Behavior ==
=== Movement ===
The gray vireo is a complete migrant though details are not fully known. The population in northern Baja California is believed to winter at the south end of the peninsula. Populations from Utah south to Arizona winter in southern Arizona and Sonora. Though it is found year-round in the Big Bend area of Texas, the population that breeds there leaves for the winter, perhaps to San Luis Potosí in Mexico. They are replaced by migrants, perhaps from central and eastern Colorado; the population from eastern Colorado south to western Texas does not winter in Sonora.

=== Feeding ===
In its breeding range the gray vireo feeds mainly on arthropods. Birds wintering in Big Bend are also mostly insectivorous, while those wintering from southwestern Arizona into Sonora feed primarily on fruit. In all seasons the species tends to forage in fairly thick vegetation such as thickets, scrub, and small trees within about 4 m (15 ft) of the ground. It takes food by several methods including gleaning from foliage and branches, snatching while briefly hovering after a short flight, hawking in mid-air, and by pouncing from a perch. During the breeding season the species typically is seen singly, in pairs, or in family groups; on the wintering grounds it sometimes forms small flocks with other gray vireos and other species.

=== Breeding ===
The gray vireo breeds between early May and late August. Both sexes begin nest building but the female does more of the later construction. The nest is a cup woven from grasses, soft barks strips, other plant fibers, and spider web suspended from a branch. Most known clutches were of three eggs but clutches of from one to four have been found. The eggs are white spotted with various shades of brown. Both sexes incubate, for a period of 12 to 14 days. Both parents brood and incubate nestlings for the 13 to 14 days from hatch to fledging. Nests are often abandoned if a brown-headed cowbird (Molothrus ater) lays an egg in it (see brood parasitism).

=== Vocalization ===
Male gray vireos sing a "che wi, chee wi, choo or che weet, chee, che chra weet", with much variation by and among individuals. They also sing a longer song of up to nine syllables. Both sexes make a slightly descending trill, a "buzzy eh-eh-eh-eh-eh scolding call, a "chickadee-like zu-zu-zu-zu" and other calls. Birds sing year-round but at a higher rate during the breeding season. Males sing both in flight and while perched.

== Status ==
The IUCN has assessed the gray vireo as being of Least Concern. It has a very large range and its estimated population of 460,000 mature individuals is believed to be increasing. No immediate threats have been identified. "Because its breeding and wintering ranges are relatively remote, Gray Vireo generally thought to be little affected by direct human interference."
