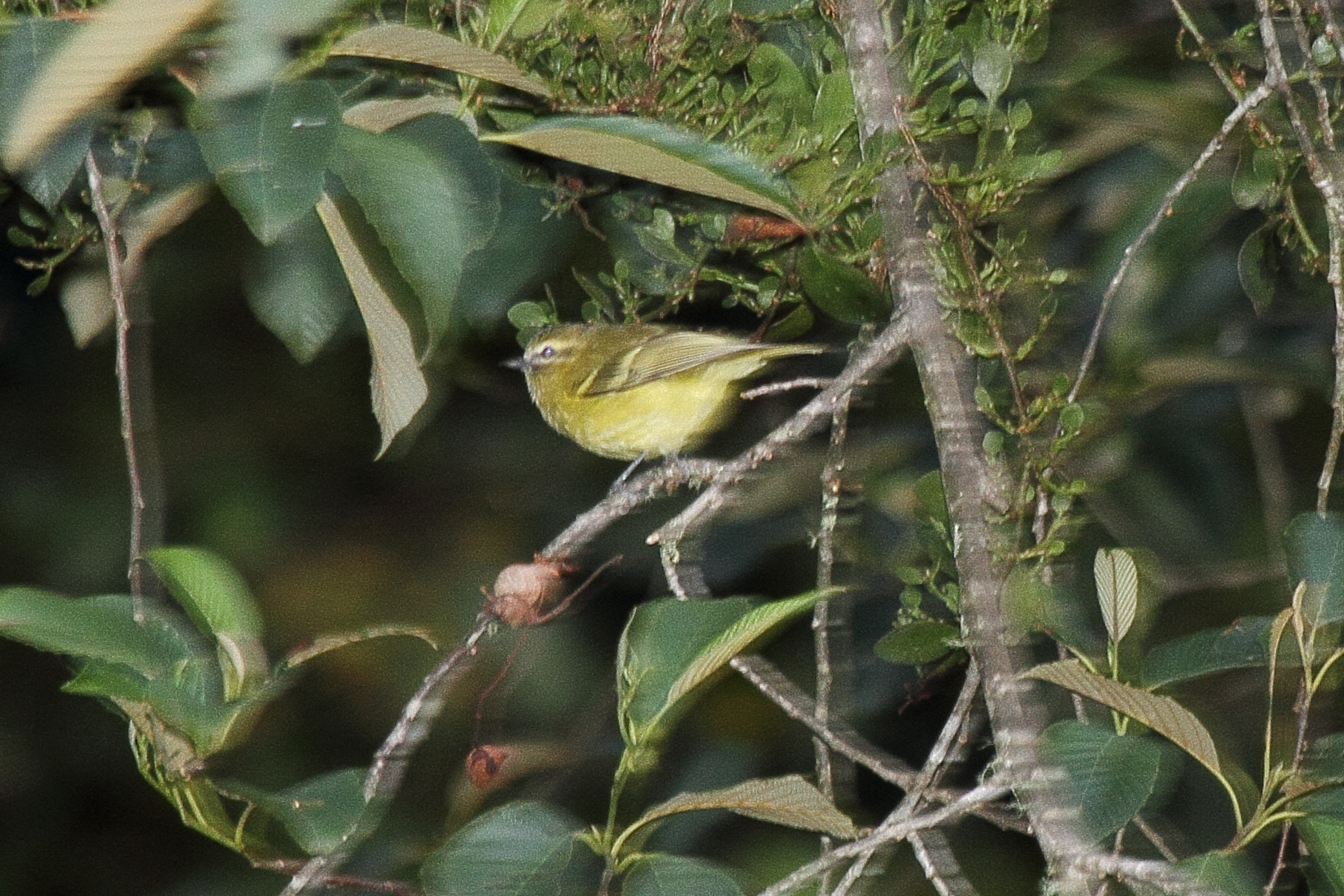

Conservation status
- Least Concern (IUCN 3.1)

Scientific classification
- Kingdom: Animalia
- Phylum: Chordata
- Class: Aves
- Order: Passeriformes
- Family: Vireonidae
- Genus: Vireo
- Species: V. carmioli

Binomial name
- Vireo carmioli Baird, 1866

= Yellow-winged vireo =

Species of bird

The yellow-winged vireo, or Carmiol's vireo, (Vireo carmioli) is a small passerine bird in the family Vireonidae, the vireos, greenlets, and shrike-babblers. It is found in Costa Rica and Panama.

== Taxonomy and systematics ==
The yellow-winged vireo was originally described in 1866 as Vireo carmioli, its current binomial. Its specific epithet and alternate English name honor "Mr. Julian Carmiol, who has been so indefatigable in developing the ornithology of Costa Rica".

The yellow-winged vireo is monotypic.

== Description ==
The yellow-winged vireo is 11 to 11.5 cm (4.3 to 4.5 in) long and weighs about 13 to 15 g (0.46 to 0.53 oz). The sexes have the same plumage. Adults have a gray-green crown. A whitish to buffy yellow area above the lores and eye-ring give the appearance of spectacles. Their nape and upperparts are dull greenish. Their wing coverts are dark greenish gray with wide whitish to pale yellow tips that show as two wing bars. Their primaries and secondaries are blackish gray with wide yellow-green edges. Their rectrices are blackish gray with wide greenish yellow edges on the outer webs. Their throat is yellowish white, their breast and belly yellow with yellowish green sides, and their vent yellow. They have a brown iris, a blackish maxilla, a pale gray mandible, and gray or bluish gray legs and feet. Juveniles have a more brownish back and more ochraceous wing bars than adults, with a buffy white supercilium and a buff tinge on the breast. It is the only vireo found in Costa Rica that has both yellow wing bars and yellow underparts.

== Distribution and habitat ==
The yellow-winged vireo is found in the Cordillera Central and Dota Mountains of Costa Rica and the Cordillera de Talamanca that stretches from central Costa Rica south into western Panama's Chiriquí Province. It inhabits humid evergreen forest in the upper subtropical and temperate zones. In elevation in Costa Rica it ranges from about 1,900 m (6,200 ft) up to treeline at about 3,000 m (9,800 ft). In Panama it ranges from about 1,300 m (4,300 ft) up to treeline.

== Behavior ==
=== Movement ===
The yellow-winged vireo is mostly a sedentary year-round resident, though some individuals move down to about 1,500 m (4,900 ft) in the wet season.

=== Feeding ===
The yellow-winged vireo feeds on insects, spiders, and berries. It forages at all levels in the interior and edges of the forest and often joins mixed-species feeding flocks.

=== Breeding ===
The yellow-winged vireo breeds between March and June during the transition from the dry to wet seasons. The nest is a cup made from green leaves, mosses, lichens, and similar materials and is typically hung in a branch fork between about 3 and 20 m (10 and 65 ft) above the ground. The clutch is two eggs that are white with dark spots. Both parents build the nest, incubate the clutch, and provision nestlings. The incubation period and time to fledging are not known.

=== Vocalization ===
The yellow-winged vireo's song is "a leisurely series of two- and three-note phrases with distinct pauses between phrases". It has been written as "cheeyah, cheeyah, chipcheewee, interspersed with longer pauses". Its calls include a "nasal net" and a "chwick".

== Status ==
The IUCN has assessed the yellow-winged vireo as being of Least Concern. It has a somewhat limited range; its population size is not known and is believed to be stable. No immediate threats have been identified. It is considered common in Costa Rica. "Considerable portions of this species' habitat are protected in private or public reserves, including e.g. Volcán Poás National Park, in Costa Rica, Volcán Barú National Park, in Panama, and La Amistad National Park, shared between those two countries."
