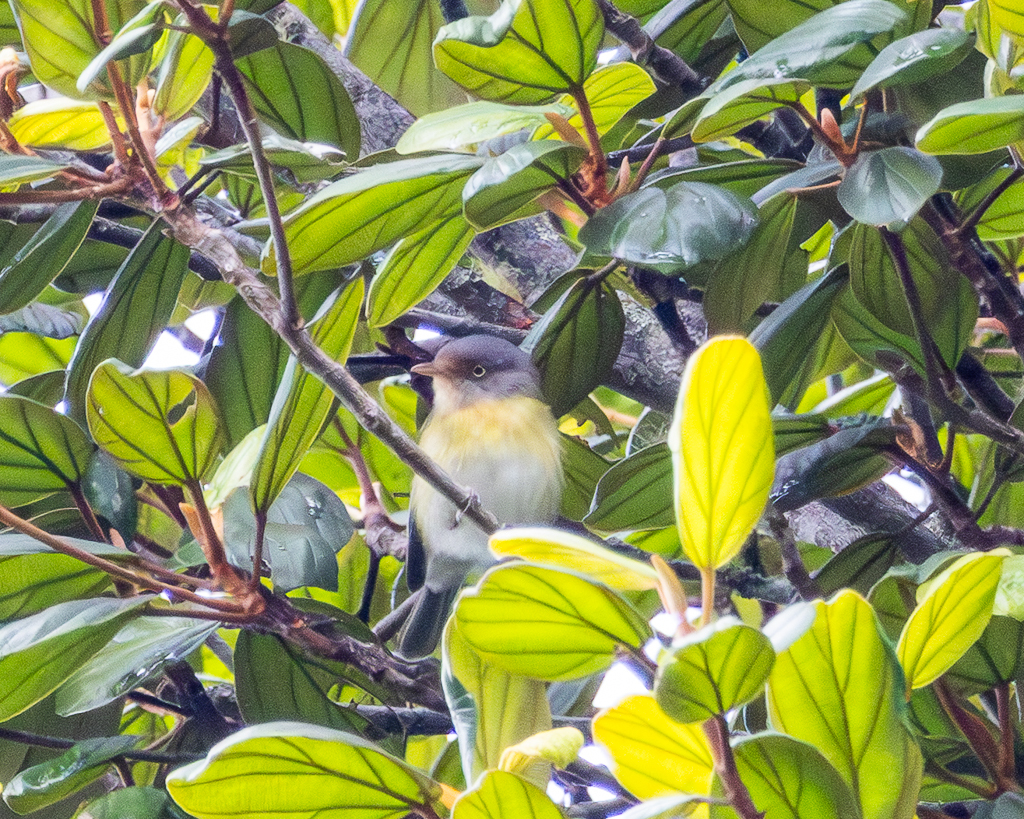

Conservation status
- Least Concern (IUCN 3.1)

Scientific classification
- Kingdom: Animalia
- Phylum: Chordata
- Class: Aves
- Order: Passeriformes
- Family: Vireonidae
- Genus: Vireo
- Species: V. sclateri

Binomial name
- Vireo sclateri (Salvin & Godman, 1883)

Synonyms
- Hylophilus sclateri

= Tepui vireo =

Species of bird

The tepui vireo, or tepui greenlet, (Vireo sclateri) is a species of bird in the family Vireonidae, the vireos, greenlets, and shrike-babblers. It is found in Brazil, Guyana, Suriname, and Venezuela.

== Taxonomy and systematics ==
The tepui vireo was originally described in 1883 as Hylophilus sclateri. Based on a 2014 publication, taxonomic systems reassigned it to genus Vireo. During its time in genus Hylophilus it was called the tepui greenlet.

The tepui vireo is monotypic.

== Description ==
The tepui vireo is 12 cm (4.7 in) long and weighs 10 to 12.5 g (0.35 to 0.44 oz). The sexes have almost the same plumage. Adults have a buffy forehead and lores on an otherwise gray face. Their crown and nape are gray and their upperparts olive-green. Their wings are gray with thin paler gray edges on the outer webs of the primaries and secondaries. Their tail is deep gray with paler edges on the feathers' outer webs. Their chin and throat are white, their breast yellow with greenish yellow sides, their flanks greenish yellow, their belly dull white, and their vent white or yellow-tinged white. The yellow of the breast forms a band that in males is more sharply defined than in females. Both sexes have a gray or white iris, a dark brownish maxilla, a dusky pinkish mandible, and pinkish gray to pinkish legs and feet. Juveniles have a dark iris.

== Distribution and habitat ==
The tepui vireo is primarily a bird of the tepui region where southeastern Venezuela's Amazonas and Bolívar states, extreme northern Brazil, and western Guyana meet. In addition, it was discovered in 2005 on Tafelberg in central Suriname. It inhabits the interior and edges of humid and wet montane forest on the tepuis, where it ranges in elevation between 600 and 2,000 m (2,000 and 6,600 ft).

== Behavior ==
=== Movement ===
The tepui vireo is believed to be a sedentary year-round resident.

=== Feeding ===
The tepui vireo's diet is not known in detail but is mostly insects. It forages energetically, within the forest in the subcanopy and canopy and lower on its edges. It often hangs upside-down to take prey from leaves. It frequently joins mixed-species feeding flocks.

=== Breeding ===
Nothing is known about the tepui vireo's breeding biology.

=== Vocalization ===
The tepui vireo's song is unlike that of any other member of genus Vireo, "a short, clear whistled suuWEEEeeuu, rising then falling quickly, often over and over". It also makes "a nasal, downslurred scold".

== Status ==
The IUCN has assessed the tepui vireo as being of Least Concern. Its population size is not known and is believed to be decreasing. No immediate threats have been identified. It is considered common in Venezuela. "Much of this species' habitat is protected by its remoteness; some areas of its range lie within national parks, although some of these are poorly protected."
