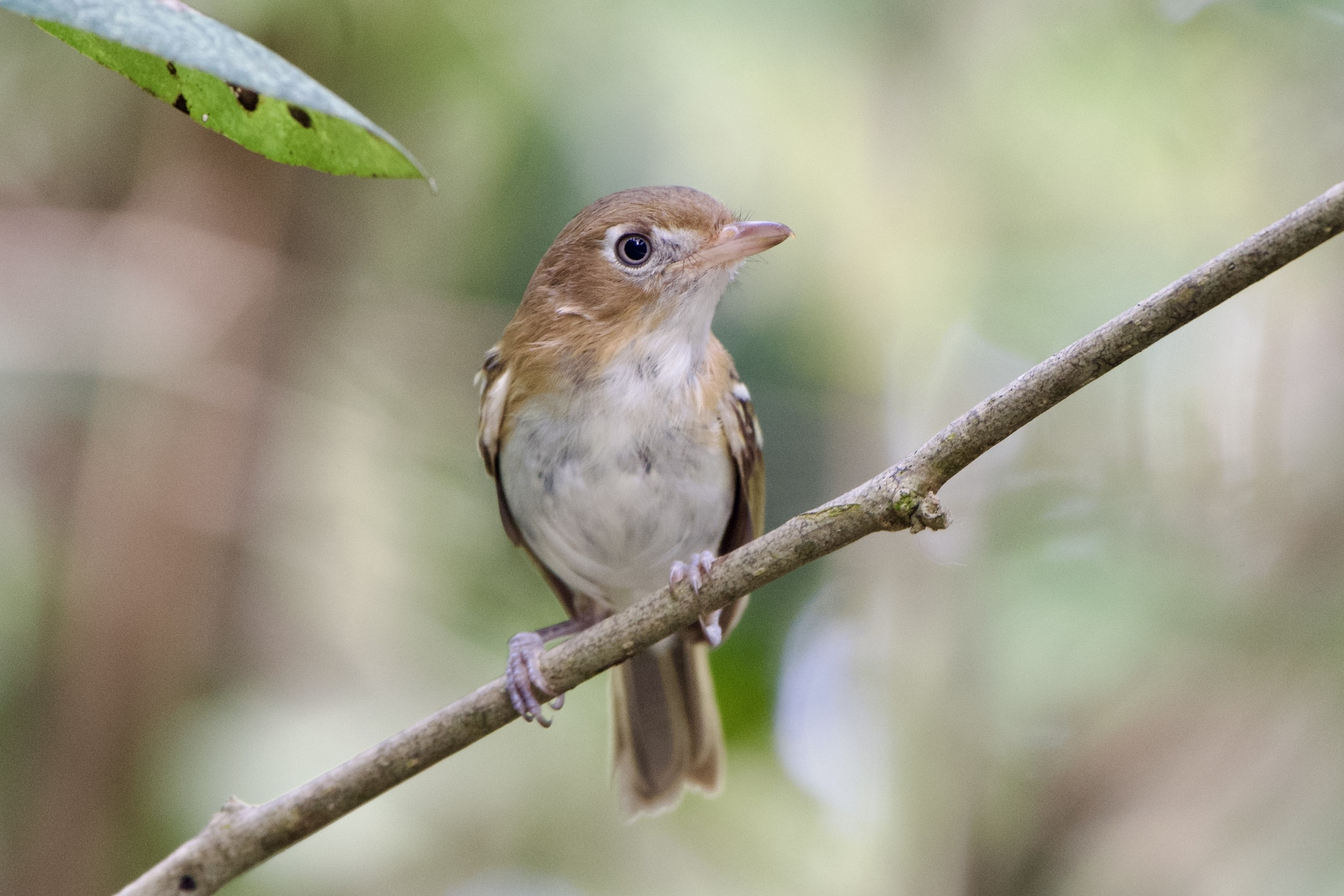

Conservation status
- Near Threatened (IUCN 3.1)

Scientific classification
- Kingdom: Animalia
- Phylum: Chordata
- Class: Aves
- Order: Passeriformes
- Family: Vireonidae
- Genus: Vireo
- Species: V. bairdi

Binomial name
- Vireo bairdi Ridgway, 1885
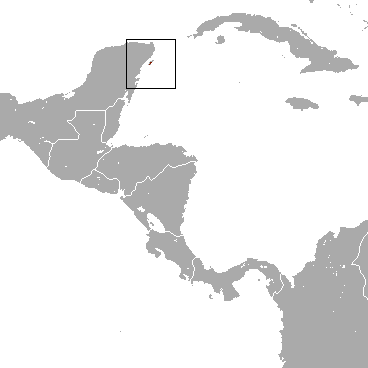
- Cozumel vireo range

= Cozumel vireo =

Species of bird

The Cozumel vireo (Vireo bairdi) is a Near Threatened species of bird in the family Vireonidae, the vireos, greenlets, and shrike-babblers. It is endemic to the Mexican island of Cozumel off the Yucatán Peninsula.

== Taxonomy and systematics ==
The Cozumel vireo was originally described in 1885 as Vireo bairdi, its current binomial. The species is monotypic.

== Description ==
The Cozumel vireo is 11.5 to 12.5 cm (4.5 to 4.9 in) long and weighs about 11 to 14.5 g (0.39 to 0.51 oz). The sexes have the same plumage. Adults have a dark chestnut-brown crown, nape, and ear coverts. They have an off-white patch from the lores to the eye and a wide white eye-ring; together they look like spectacles. Their upperparts are light chestnut-brown. Their wing coverts are gray-brown with wide yellowish-white tips that form two bold wing bars. Their flight feathers are gray-brown; the primaries and secondaries have greenish or olive-yellow edges on the outer webs and the tertials have whitish edges. Their tail is brownish gray with greenish edges on the outer webs of the feathers. Their chin and throat are off-white, their breast off-white with chestnut- or cinnamon-brown sides, their flanks brownish, and their belly and vent off-white. They have a brown iris, a pinkish bill with a darker tip, and lead-blue, bluish pink, or dusky pinkish legs and feet. Juveniles are overall paler than adults, with purer brown sides of the breast and a darker brown iris.

== Distribution and habitat ==
The Cozumel vireo is found only on Cozumel Island off the coast of the Mexican state of Quintana Roo of the eastern Yucatán Peninsula. It inhabits scrubby woodlands and similar landscapes such as brushy abandoned fields, young secondary woodland, and thickets in more mature woodland.

== Behavior ==
=== Movement ===
The Cozumel vireo is a sedentary year-round resident.

=== Feeding ===
The Cozumel vireo's diet has not been studied. The species typically forages in low to middle-height vegetation.

=== Breeding ===
The Cozumel vireo's breeding season is not fully defined but includes May to July. Three nests were discovered in 2009. They were open cups woven to and hanging from parallel branches. The external materials included plant fibers, leaves, and spider web with some lichen, bark, and rootlets attached and they were lined with fine grass fragments. All three were within 2 m (7 ft) of the ground in short trees. One contained three eggs, one had two eggs, and the third one egg and one nestling; the eggs were white with reddish brown flecks. The incubation period is estimated to be about 14 days and the time to fledging 11 to 12 days.

=== Vocalization ===
The Cozumel vireo's song is a "high, sharp, rapid rhythmic wietweiweit--". Its calls "include rapid scolding like that of a wren (Troglodytidae)".

== Status ==
The IUCN originally in 1988 assessed the Cozumel vireo as being of Least Concern but since 2017 as Near Threatened. It has a very small range in which it is estimated to occupy 360 km^{2} (140 sq mi) of the island's approximately 480 km^{2} (190 sq mi). Its estimated population is between 20,000 and 50,000 mature individuals; the population trend is not known. "Substantial areas of habitat have been lost to tourist development, but much remains intact and the species seems to adjust well to secondary habitat. It could possibly suffer habitat loss caused by hurricanes."
