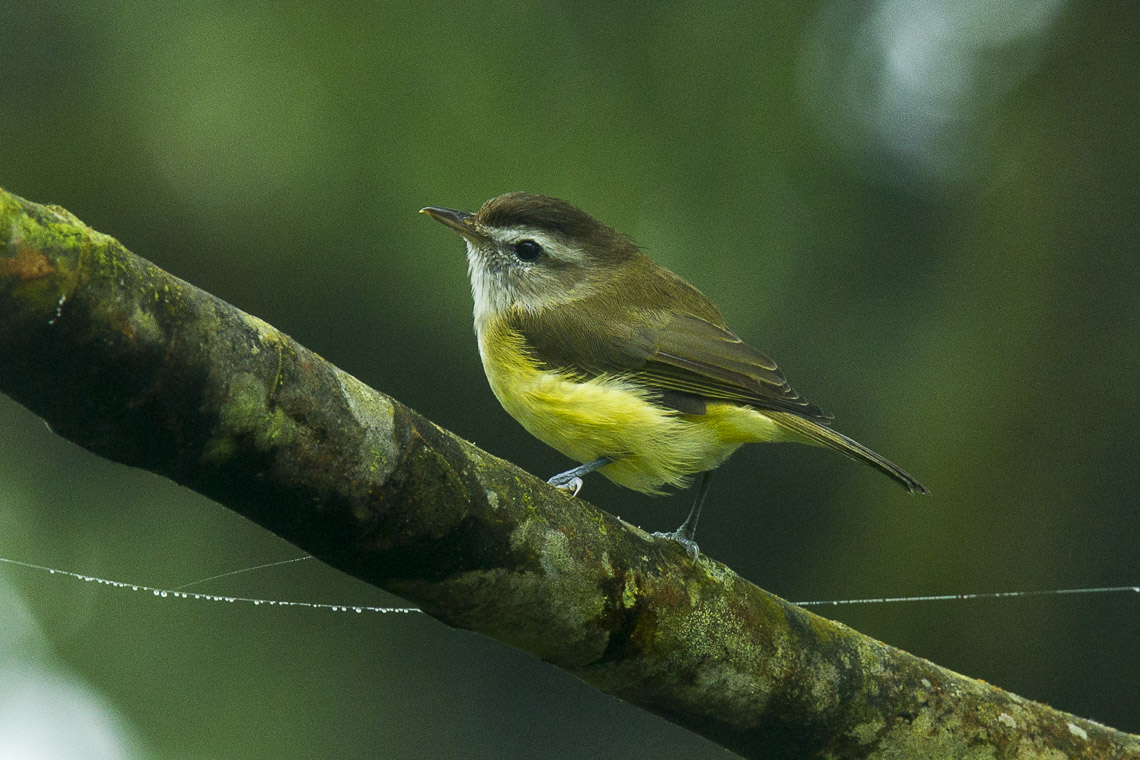

Conservation status
- Least Concern (IUCN 3.1)

Scientific classification
- Kingdom: Animalia
- Phylum: Chordata
- Class: Aves
- Order: Passeriformes
- Family: Vireonidae
- Genus: Vireo
- Species: V. leucophrys

Binomial name
- Vireo leucophrys (Lafresnaye, 1844)

Synonyms
- Vireo gilvus leucophrys

Audio

= Brown-capped vireo =

Species of bird

The brown-capped vireo (Vireo leucophrys) is a small passerine bird in the family Vireonidae, the vireos, greenlets, and shrike-babblers. It is found in Mexico, much of Central America, and in South America from Venezuela to Bolivia.

== Taxonomy and systematics ==
The brown-capped vireo was originally described in 1844 as Hylophilus leucophrys. For much of the twentieth century it was treated as conspecific with the warbling vireo (Vireo gilvus).

The brown-capped vireo's further taxonomy is unsettled. The IOC, AviList, and BirdLife International's Handbook of the Birds of the World assign it these 14 subspecies:

- V. l. eleanorae Sutton & Burleigh, 1940
- V. l. dubius (Phillips, AR, 1991)
- V. l. amauronotus Salvin & Godman, 1881
- V. l. strenuus Nelson, 1900
- V. l. bulli Rowley, JS, 1968
- V. l. palmeri (Phillips, AR, 1991)
- V. l. costaricensis (Ridgway, 1903)
- V. l. chiriquensis (Bangs, 1903)
- V. l. dissors Zimmer, JT, 1941
- V. l. mirandae Hartert, EJO, 1917
- V. l. josephae Sclater, PL, 1859
- V. l. leucophrys (Lafresnaye, 1844)
- V. l. maranonicus Zimmer, JT, 1941
- V. l. laetissimus (Todd, 1924)

However, the Clements taxonomy does not recognize V. l. dubius, V. l. palmeri, and V. l. costaricensis. It includes V. l. dubius within V. l. eleanorae, V. l. palmeri within V. l. strenuus, and V. l. costaricensis within V. l. chiriquensis. In addition it calls V. l. eleanorae, V. l. bulli, V. l. amauronotus, and V. l. strenuus the "(northern) amauronotus group" and the other subspecies the "(southern) leucophrys group" within the species.

This article follows the 14-subspecies model.

== Description ==
The brown-capped vireo is 11.5 to 12.5 cm (4.5 to 4.9 in) long and weighs about 12 to 13.5 g (0.42 to 0.48 oz). The sexes have the same plumage. Adults of the nominate subspecies V. l. leucophrys have an olive-brown crown, a white supercilium, a dusky spot on their lores, a dusky streak behind the eye, and grayish white ear coverts. Their upperparts, wings, and tail are grayish olive to brownish olive-green with yellow edges on the wing coverts. Their throat and upper breast are grayish white and the rest of their underparts pale yellow.

The other subspecies of the brown-capped vireo differ from the nominate and each other thus:

- V. l. eleanorae: browner (less olive) crown than nominate
- V. l. dubius: browner (less olive) crown than nominate
- V. l. amauronotus: browner (less olive) crown than nominate
- V. l. strenuus: browner crown and upperparts than nominate
- V. l. bulli: more blackish brown crown, blackish olive upperparts, and whiter underparts than others
- V. l. palmeri: overall brighter than nominate with somewhat more greenish back
- V. l. costaricensis: sooty brown crown and white throat
- V. l. chiriquensis: dark brown crown, grayish olive-green upperparts, and paler underparts than nominate
- V. l. dissors: grayer crown and greener upperparts than nominate
- V. l. mirandae: dark brown crown
- V. l. josephae: dark brown crown, dark olive back, and white throat and breast
- V. l. maranonicus: similar to josephae but lighter crown and more yellowish throat and breast
- V. l. laetissimus: brown crown

All subspecies have a brown iris, a dark brown, gray, or black maxilla, a horn or whitish mandible with a blue-gray streak, and blue gray or bluish gray legs and feet.

== Distribution and habitat ==
The subspecies of the brown-capped vireo are found thus:

- V. l. eleanorae: northeastern Mexico's Sierra Madre Oriental from southern Tamaulipas to Hildalgo
- V. l. dubius: central Tamaulipas
- V. l. amauronotus: southeastern Mexico from northeastern Puebla east to west-central Veracruz
- V. l. strenuus: from Chiapas in southern Mexico south through Guatemala into Honduras
- V. l. bulli: southeastern Oaxaca and southern Chiapas into western Guatemala
- V. l. palmeri: Honduras
- V. l. costaricensis: northern and central Costa Rica
- V. l. chiriquensis: southern Costa Rica into western Panama
- V. l. dissors: from eastern Panama's Darién Province south into Colombia's Western and Central Andes
- V. l. mirandae: northern Colombia's Sierra Nevada de Santa Marta, the Serranía del Perijá on the Colombia/Venezuela border, the Venezuelan Andes, and the Venezuelan Coastal Range
- V. l. josephae: from extreme southwestern Colombia south on the western Andean slope through Ecuador into northwestern Peru
- V. l. leucophrys: Colombia's Eastern Andes and south on the eastern Andean slope through Ecuador to central Peru
- V. l. maranonicus: both slopes of the Andes in northern Peru
- V. l. laetissimus: eastern slope of the Andes from southern Peru south to central Bolivia

The brown-capped vireo inhabits forested landscapes in the subtropical and temperate zones. These include humid montane forest, mature secondary forest, and coffee plantations. In northern Central America it occurs in cloudforest and pine-oak and oak forest. It ranges in elevation between 1,200 and 2,000 m (3,900 and 6,600 ft) in Mexico, up to about 1,550 m (5,100 ft) in northern Central America, between 1,500 and 2,500 m (4,900 and 8,200 ft) in Costa Rica, mostly between 700 and 2,500 m (2,300 and 8,200 ft) in Venezuela, between 600 and 2,700 m (2,000 and 8,900 ft) in Colombia, mostly between 1,300 and 2,600 m (4,300 and 8,500 ft) but down to 600 m (2,000 ft) in the southwest in Ecuador, between 1,100 and 2,600 m (3,600 and 8,500 ft) in Peru, and between 600 and 2,500 m (2,000 and 8,200 ft) in Bolivia. There is one record at 500 m (1,600 ft) in Venezuela.

== Behavior ==
=== Movement ===
The brown-capped vireo is a year-round resident.

=== Feeding ===
The brown-capped vireo feeds primarily on insects and includes smaller amounts of berries in its diet, though details are lacking. It forages singly or in pairs and usually as part of a mixed-species feeding flock. It takes most prey in the upper levels of the forest and even of isolated trees. It is often seen hanging upside-down to glean or probe for prey.

=== Breeding ===
The brown-capped vireo's breeding season has not been defined but it appears to span at least March to July in parts of Mexico and in Costa Rica. It includes May and July in Ecuador, where the only two known nests were found. The nests were cups made from plant fibers and moss suspended in branch forks, and both were about 8 m (25 ft) above the ground. One held two nestlings that were being fed by both parents. The usual clutch size, incubation period, time to fledging, and other details of parental care are not known.

=== Vocalization ===
The brown-capped vireo's song has been described as "a short, sweet 2.5-3-sec. warble, similar to Warbling Vireo song", "a silky, ripping, and somewhat hurried little refrain, here you sée me hear me sing so swéet", and "a hesitating, pleasant warble of variable pattern...wurlze-wee-wee wurzle-weezle-wee wurzle-wee". One description of its call is "a wheezing, descending zreeEEEEw".

== Conservation status ==
The IUCN has assessed the brown-capped vireo as being of Least Concern. It has a very large range; its estimated population of at least 50,000 mature individuals is believed to be decreasing. No immediate threats have been identified. It is considered uncommon in northern Central America, fairly common in Costa Rica, common in Venezuela and Colombia, "widespread and often numerous" in Ecuador, and fairly common in Peru. "Human activity probably has little short term effect on [the] Brown-capped Vireo."
