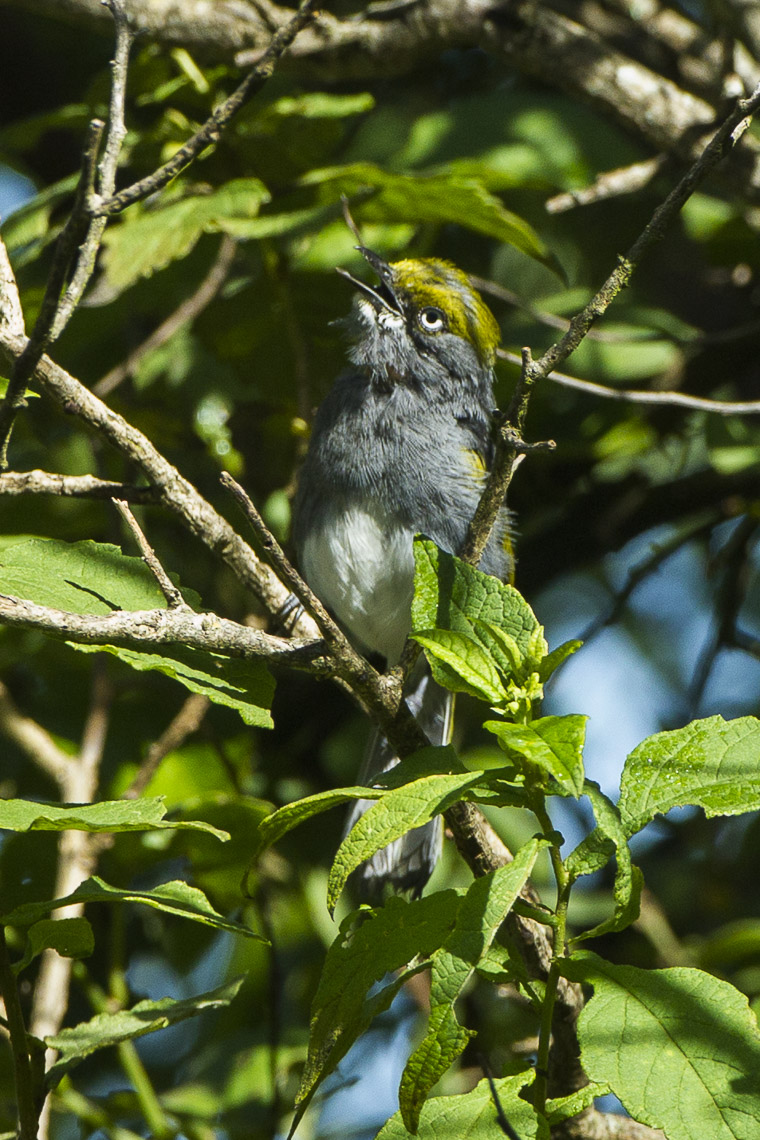

Conservation status
- Least Concern (IUCN 3.1)

Scientific classification
- Kingdom: Animalia
- Phylum: Chordata
- Class: Aves
- Order: Passeriformes
- Family: Vireonidae
- Genus: Vireo
- Species: V. brevipennis

Binomial name
- Vireo brevipennis (P.L. Sclater, 1858)

= Slaty vireo =

Species of bird

The slaty vireo (Vireo brevipennis) is a species of bird in the family Vireonidae, the vireos, greenlets, and shrike-babblers. It is endemic to Mexico.

== Taxonomy and systematics ==
The slaty vireo was originally described in 1858 as Neochloe brevipennis. The genus Neochloe was later merged into the present Vireo.

The further taxonomy of the slaty vireo is unsettled. The IOC, AviList, and BirdLife International's Handbook of the Birds of the World assign it two subspecies, the nominate V. b. brevipennis (P.L. Sclater, 1858) and V. b. browni (Miller, AH & Ray, 1944). The Clements taxonomy does not recognize V. b. browni.

This article follows the two-subspecies model.

== Description ==
The slaty vireo is 11.5 to 12 cm (4.5 to 4.7 in) long; one individual weighed 11.8 g (0.42 oz) and two others 12.3 g (0.43 oz). "Few vireos possess such striking plumage as [the] Slaty Vireo", whose appearance is unique in its range. The sexes have the same plumage. Adults of the nominate subspecies have an olive green crown. They have blackish lores on an otherwise slate gray face. Their upperparts are slate with an olive green tinge on the rump and uppertail coverts. Their wing coverts are olive green. Their wing's flight feathers and tail feathers are dull black or blackish slate with wide olive green edges on their outer webs. Their chin is white, their throat, breast, and flanks slate gray, and their belly and undertail coverts white. Juveniles have an olive head and upperparts, two buffy lemon wing bars, and whitish underparts with dusky sides to the breast. Subspecies V. b. browni has an olive green tinge from its lower back to its uppertail coverts and paler gray underparts than the nominate. Both subspecies have a white iris, a black bill, and dark gray or dusky legs and feet.

== Distribution and habitat ==
The slaty vireo is found inland in southwestern Mexico from southern Jalisco south to central Oaxaca and somewhat east into western Veracruz. It inhabits scrublands, often those with oaks, the understory and edges of pine-oak forest, and thickets. In elevation it ranges between 1,200 and 3,000 m (3,900 and 9,800 ft).

== Behavior ==
=== Movement ===
The slaty vireo is a year-round resident.

=== Feeding ===
The slaty vireo's diet is not known though it is assumed to eat mostly arthropods. It forages mostly in the understory and is described as "rather skulking".

=== Breeding ===
The slaty vireo's breeding season has not been fully defined but is known to include June and July. Its nest is a cup made from dry leaves and plant down lined with fine plant fibers and grass and suspended by its rim. Nests have been found between about 1.8 and 3 m (6 and 10 ft) above the ground. The clutch is two or three eggs that are white with sparse brown markings. The incubation period, time to fledging, and details of parental care are not known.

=== Vocalization ===
One description of the slaty vireo's song is "varied, rich, slightly burry phrases often beginning or ending with an emphatic note, chik wi-di-weuw or wheer chi-i-wik, etc.". Its calls include "a gruff, scolding, chichichi...or shehshehsheh".

== Status ==
The IUCN originally in 1994 assessed the dwarf vireo as Near Threatened and since 2000 as being of Least Concern. It has a large range; its estimated population of 20,000 to 50,000 mature individuals is believed to be decreasing. No immediate threats have been identified. Its abundance has been variously described as "uncommon to fairly common" and "very common".
