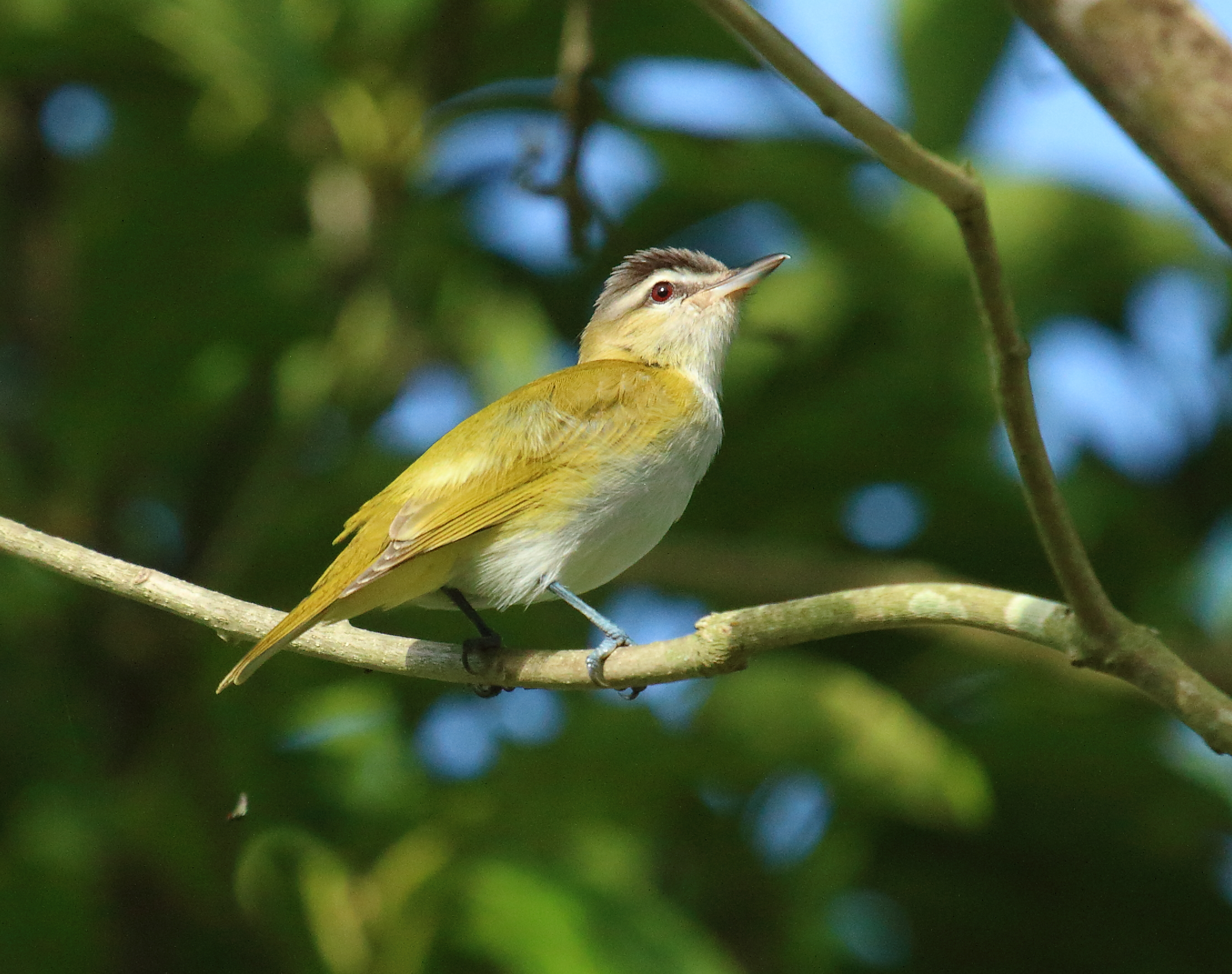
- Chivi vireo (Vireo chivi)

Scientific classification
- Kingdom: Animalia
- Phylum: Chordata
- Class: Aves
- Order: Passeriformes
- Family: Vireonidae
- Genus: Vireo; Vieillot, 1808

Type species
- Muscicapa novaeboracensis = Tanagra grisea Boddaert, 1783

Species
- See text

= Vireo (genus) =

Genus of birds

Vireo is a genus of small passerine birds restricted to the New World. Vireos typically have dull greenish plumage (hence the name, from Latin virere, "to be green"), but some are brown or gray on the back and some have bright yellow underparts. They resemble wood warblers apart from their slightly larger size and heavier bills, which in most species have a very small hook at the tip. The legs are stout.

Most species fall into two plumage groups: one with wing bars and yellow or white eye rings, and one with unmarked wings and eye stripes; however, the Chocó vireo has both wing bars and eye stripes.

Sexes are alike in all species except for the black-capped vireo, in which the male's crown is black and the female's is gray.

== Taxonomy ==
The genus Vireo was introduced in 1808 by the French ornithologist Louis Pierre Vieillot. The type species was subsequently designated as the white-eyed vireo (Vireo griseus) by German ornithologist Hans Friedrich Gadow in 1883. The word vireo was used by Latin authors for a small, green, migratory bird, probably a Eurasian golden oriole, but a European greenfinch has also been suggested.

== Feeding ==
All members of the genus mostly eat insects and other arthropods, but also eat some fruit. A common pattern is arthropods in summer and fruit in winter. Vireos take prey from leaves and branches and in midair, and the gray vireo takes 5% of its prey from the ground.

== Range and territorial behavior ==
Most species are found in Central America and northern South America. Thirteen species occur farther north, in the United States, Canada, and Bermuda; of these, all but Hutton's vireo are migratory. Vireos seldom fly long distances except in migration.

The resident species occur in pairs or family groups that maintain territories all year (except Hutton's vireo, which joins mixed feeding flocks). Most of the migrants defend winter territories against conspecifics. The exceptions are the complex comprising the red-eyed vireo, the yellow-green vireo, the black-whiskered vireo, and the Yucatan vireo, which winter in small, wandering flocks.

== Voice and breeding ==
Males of most species are persistent singers. Songs are usually rather simple, ranging from monotonous, in some species of the Caribbean littoral and islands, to elaborate and pleasant to human ears in the Chocó vireo. Calls often include "scolding chatters and mews".

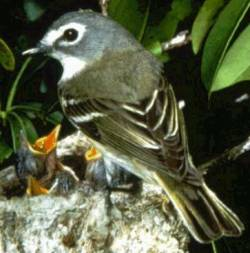
Blue-headed vireo

The species whose nests are known all build a cup-shaped nest that hangs from branches. Its outer layer is made of coarse leaf and bark strips or of moss, depending on the species; in either case, the material is bound with spider silk and ornamented with spider egg cases. The lining is made of fine grass stems neatly circling the cup. In most species, both sexes work on the nest, but the female adds the lining. In the red-eyed, black-whiskered, Yucatan, and Philadelphia vireos, the male does not help, instead singing and accompanying the female while she builds the nest. The female does most of the incubation, spelled by the male except in the red-eyed vireo complex.

The eggs are whitish; all but the black-capped and dwarf vireos have sparse, fine brown or red-brown spots at the wide end. Tropical species lay two, while temperate-zone species lay four or five. Incubation lasts 11 to 13 days, and the young fledge after the same amount of time. Both sexes feed the nestlings arthropods, and each fledgeling is fed by one parent or the other (not both) for as long as 20 days.

== Species ==
The genus contains 34 species:

Group	Image	Scientific name	Common name	Distribution
The "hypochryseus" group		Golden vireo	Vireo hypochryseus	Mexico
The "olivaceous" group		Yellow-green vireo	Vireo flavoviridis	southern Texas, Mexico (the Sierra Madre Occidental and Sierra Madre Oriental—also the Cordillera Neovolcanica) south to central Panama
The "olivaceous" group		Red-eyed vireo	Vireo olivaceus	Canada and the eastern and northwestern United States, Argentina, Uruguay, Paraguay and Bolivia
The "olivaceous" group		Yucatan vireo	Vireo magister	Belize, Honduras, Mexico
The "olivaceous" group		Black-whiskered vireo	Vireo altiloquus	southern Florida, USA, and the West Indies as far south as the offshore islands of Venezuela
The "olivaceous" group		Chivi vireo	Vireo chivi	northeastern Colombia, into Venezuela and the entirety of the Guianas into eastern Brazil
The "olivaceous" group		Noronha vireo	Vireo gracilirostris	Fernando de Noronha, Brazil
The "gilvus" group		Tepui vireo	Vireo sclateri	western Guyana and northern Brazil
The "gilvus" group		Philadelphia vireo	Vireo philadelphicus	Canada to Central America
The "gilvus" group		Western warbling vireo	Vireo swainsoni	Alaska to Alberta south to Central America
The "gilvus" group		Eastern warbling vireo	Vireo gilvus	Alberta to Quebec south to Southeastern United States; winters in Mexico and Central America
The "gilvus" group		Brown-capped vireo	Vireo leucophrys	Southern Mexico south to northwestern Bolivia
The "eye-ringed" group		Hutton's vireo	Vireo huttoni	southern British Columbia in Canada to central Guatemala in Central America
The "eye-ringed" group		Gray vireo	Vireo vicinior	southwestern United States and northern Baja California to western Texas
The "eye-ringed" group		Yellow-throated vireo	Vireo flavifrons	southern United States, Mexico, the Caribbean, and Central America
The "eye-ringed" group		Yellow-winged vireo	Vireo carmioli	Costa Rica and western Panama
The "eye-ringed" group		Choco vireo	Vireo masteri	western Colombia and north-west Ecuador
The "eye-ringed" group		Blue-headed vireo	Vireo solitarius	Canada and northern United States
The "eye-ringed" group		Cassin's vireo	Vireo cassinii	southern British Columbia in Canada through the western coastal states of the United States.
The "eye-ringed" group		Plumbeous vireo	Vireo plumbeus	southeastern Montana and western South Dakota south to the Pacific coast of Mexico
The "eye-ringed" group		Blue Mountain vireo	Vireo osburni	Jamaica
The "eye-ringed" group		Flat-billed vireo	Vireo nanus	Hispaniola
The "eye-ringed" group		Mangrove vireo	Vireo pallens	Belize, Costa Rica, El Salvador, Guatemala, Honduras, Mexico, and Nicaragua
The "eye-ringed" group		Providencia vireo	Vireo approximans	Isla de Providencia
The "eye-ringed" group		Cozumel vireo	Vireo bairdi	Mexico
The "eye-ringed" group		San Andres vireo	Vireo caribaeus	islands of St. Andrew (or San Andrés) and Providencia
The "eye-ringed" group		White-eyed vireo	Vireo griseus	eastern United States from New England west to northern Missouri and south to Texas and Florida, and also in eastern Mexico, northern Central America, Cuba and the Bahamas
The "eye-ringed" group		Thick-billed vireo	Vireo crassirostris	West Indies in the Bahamas, Turks and Caicos Islands, Cayman Islands, Tortuga Island in Haiti and Cuba
The "eye-ringed" group		Jamaican vireo	Vireo modestus	Jamaica
The "eye-ringed" group		Cuban vireo	Vireo gundlachii	Cuba
The "eye-ringed" group		Bell's vireo	Vireo bellii	Western North America and Central America
The "eye-ringed" group		Puerto Rican vireo	Vireo latimeri	Puerto Rico
The "eye-ringed" group		Black-capped vireo	Vireo atricapilla	south from south-central Kansas through central Oklahoma and Texas to central Coahuila, Mexico
The "eye-ringed" group		Dwarf vireo	Vireo nelsoni	Mexico
The "eye-ringed" group		Slaty vireo	Vireo brevipennis	southern Mexico
