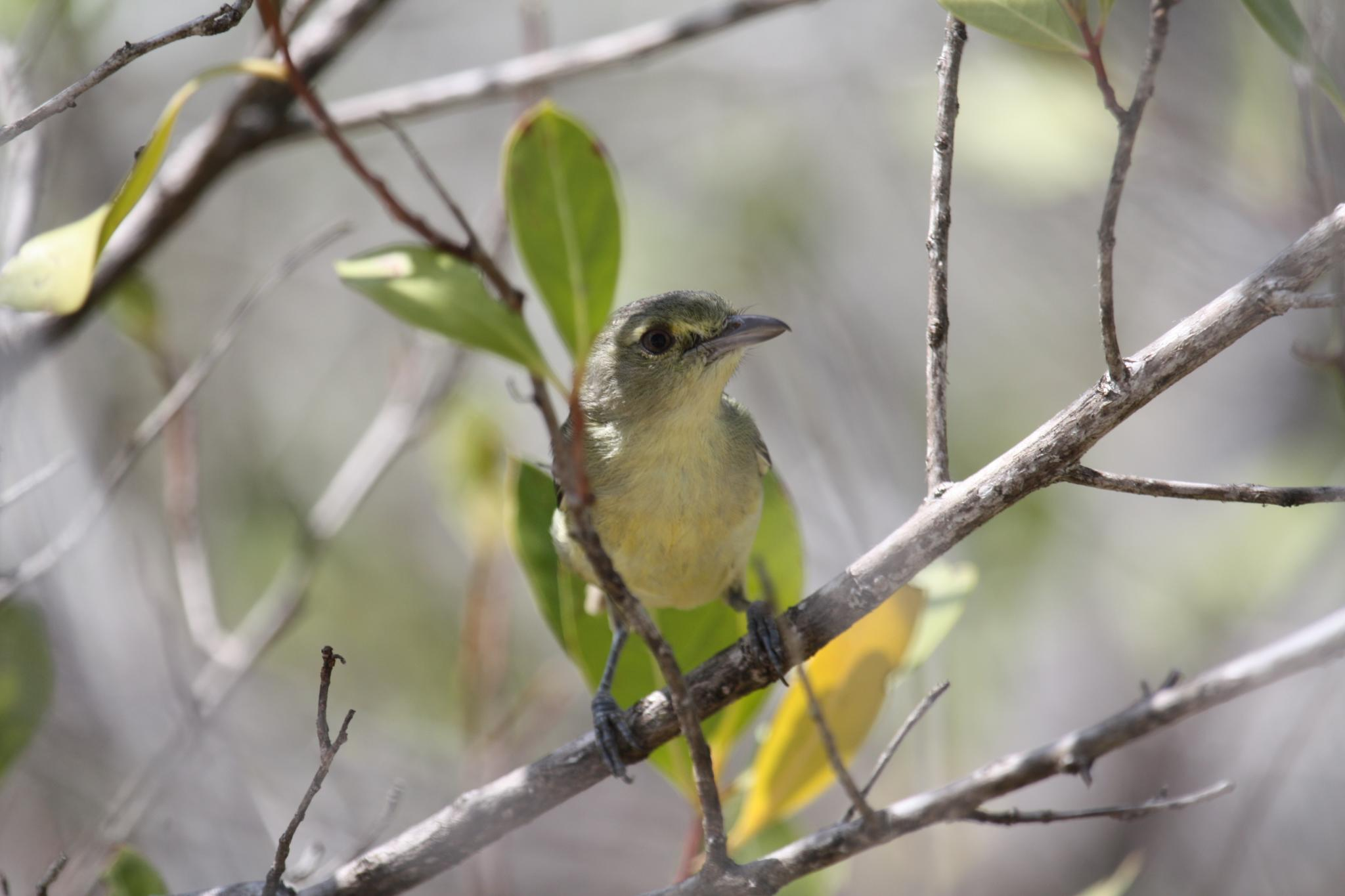

Conservation status
- Least Concern (IUCN 3.1)

Scientific classification
- Kingdom: Animalia
- Phylum: Chordata
- Class: Aves
- Order: Passeriformes
- Family: Vireonidae
- Genus: Vireo
- Species: V. pallens

Binomial name
- Vireo pallens Salvin, 1863

= Mangrove vireo =

Species of bird

The mangrove vireo (Vireo pallens) is a species of bird in the family Vireonidae, the vireos, greenlets, and shrike-babblers. It is found in Mexico and every Central American country except Panama.

== Taxonomy and systematics ==
The mangrove vireo was formally described in 1863 by the English naturalist Osbert Salvin based on specimens collected at El Realejo in Nicaragua and at Puntarenas in Costa Rica. He coined the current binomial Vireo pallens. The specific epithet is from Latin meaning "pale-colored", "greenish" or "yellowish". El Realejo has been designated the type locality.

The mangrove vireo's taxonomy is unsettled. The IOC, AviList, and BirdLife International's Handbook of the Birds of the World assign it these 10 subspecies:

- V. p. paluster Moore, RT, 1938
- V. p. semiflavus Salvin, 1863
- V. p. ochraceus Salvin, 1863
- V. p. salvini Van Rossem, 1934
- V. p. pallens Salvin, 1863
- V. p. wetmorei Phillips, AR, 1991
- V. p. angulensis Parkes, 1990
- V. p. browningi Phillips, AR, 1991
- V. p. nicoyensis Parkes, 1990
- V. p. approximans Ridgway, 1884

The Clements taxonomy does not recognize V. p. wetmorei and V. p. browningi, including them within V. p. semiflavus.

Some twentieth century authors treated the mangrove vireo as conspecific with the white-eyed vireo (V. griseus). Others have suggested that two or three species are represented within the mangrove vireo because of plumage and vocal differences between the "Pacific" and "Caribbean" groups of subspecies.

Subspecies V. p. approximans was originally described by Robert Ridgway as a species. Ridgway noted the bird's strong similarity to what is now the thick-billed vireo (V. crassirostris). Until the late 2010s approximans was treated as a subspecies of crassirostris before taxonomic systems began transferring it to its present position as a subspecies of V. pallens.

This article follows the 10-subspecies model.

== Description ==
The mangrove vireo is 11 to 12 cm (4.3 to 4.7 in) long and weighs about 9 to 13 g (0.32 to 0.46 oz). The sexes have the same plumage. Adults of the nominate subspecies V. p. pallens have a mostly greenish brown crown, face, and nape with a buffy area from above the lores to past the eye. Their upperparts are greenish brown. Their wing coverts are dark gray with yellowish white tips that form two wing bars. Their flight feathers are dark gray; the primaries and secondaries have thin yellowish green edges on the outer webs and the tertials have whitish edges. Their tail is dark gray with greenish edges on the feathers' outer webs. Their chin is whitish yellow and their throat and underparts grayish with a faint yellow tinge on the lower flanks and belly.

The other subspecies of the mangrove vireo differ from the nominate and each other thus:

- V. p. paluster: larger than nominate with yellower underparts
- V. p. semiflavus: brighter greenish upperparts and brighter yellow underparts than all other subspecies
- V. p. ochraceus: like the nominate with a dull yellow iris
- V. p. salvini: smaller and paler than nominate with greenish olive upperparts and yellowish underparts
- V. p. wetmorei: like semiflavus
- V. p. angulensis: smaller than nominate, with brownish drab cheeks and a pale olive back with a drab brownish wash
- V. p. browningi: like semiflavus
- V. p. nicoyensis: paler and duller overall than other subspecies, with almost pure white throat and belly and a highly variable iris color from light brown to white
- V. p. approximans: yellowish breast; larger and wider bill than others

The mangrove vireo's subspecies have a brownish straw to dirty white iris, a dark brown or gray brown maxilla, a paler mandible, and gray-blue legs and feet.

== Distribution and habitat ==
The mangrove vireo has a widely disjunct distribution. The subspecies are found thus:

- V. p. paluster: coastal northwestern Mexico from southwestern Sonora south to Nayarit
- V. p. semiflavus: from northern Guatemala and southern Belize south across northern Honduras into eastern Nicaragua to Bluefields
- V. p. ochraceus: from southern Oaxaca in southwestern Mexico south along the Pacific coast through Guatemala into El Salvador's Usulután Department
- V. p. salvini: southeastern Mexico's Yucatán Peninsula and northern Belize
- V. p. pallens: southern Honduras, western Nicaragua, and western Costa Rica
- V. p. wetmorei Isla El Cayo off eastern Guatemala
- V. p. angulensis: the Bay Islands off north Honduras
- V. p. browningi: southeastern Nicaragua
- V. p. nicoyensis: Nicoya Peninsula and around the Bay of Nicoya in northwestern Costa Rica
- V. p. approximans: Isla de Providencia and Isla Santa Catalina off the east coast of Nicaragua

The mangrove vireo inhabits different landscapes on the Pacific and Caribbean sides. The Pacific subspecies V. p. paluster, V. p. ochraceus, V. p. pallens, and V. p. nicoyensis are found almost exclusively in mangroves, especiall red mangrove (Rhizophora). The other subspecies, found along the Caribbean coast and nearby islands, inhabits more varied landscapes. In addition to mangroves these include scrubby woodlands, fields being overgrown with bushes, young secondary forest, and the edges of more mature forest.

== Behavior ==
=== Movement ===
The mangrove vireo is a sedentary year-round resident.

=== Feeding ===
The mangrove vireo feeds on insects, spiders, and fruits. It usually forages low in vegetation, singly or in pairs, and sometimes joins mixed-species feeding flocks.

=== Breeding ===
Three nests of the mangrove vireo are known; all were found in Belize between April and June. One was described as a deep cup made from thin strips of bark, grass, lichen, and other plant fibers bound together with spider web and lined with pine needles. It was in a branch fork about 1 m (3 ft) above the ground in a live oak (Quercus oleoides) and held three eggs. The other nests had two and three eggs respectively. Nothing else is known about the species' breeding biology.

=== Vocalization ===
The mangrove vireo's vocalizations vary among the subspecies. In Mexico it sings "a series of 3–12 (usually 4–6) twanging, slightly disyllabic notes". In northern Central America different populations sing jear-jear-jear-jear-jear and wei-wei-wei-wei-wei. In Costa Rica the species sings "a scratchy, monotone chi-chi-chi-chi-chi-chi-chi". The species also makes "a nasal or buzzy scolding and a drawn-out, mewing j-weehr".

== Status ==
The IUCN has assessed the mangrove vireo as being of Least Concern. It has a very large range; its estimated population of at least 500,000 mature individuals is believed to be decreasing. No immediate threats have been identified. It is considered abundant on the islands along the Caribbean coast of northern Central America but uncommon on both of the mainland coasts. It is fairly common in its small Costa Rican range.
