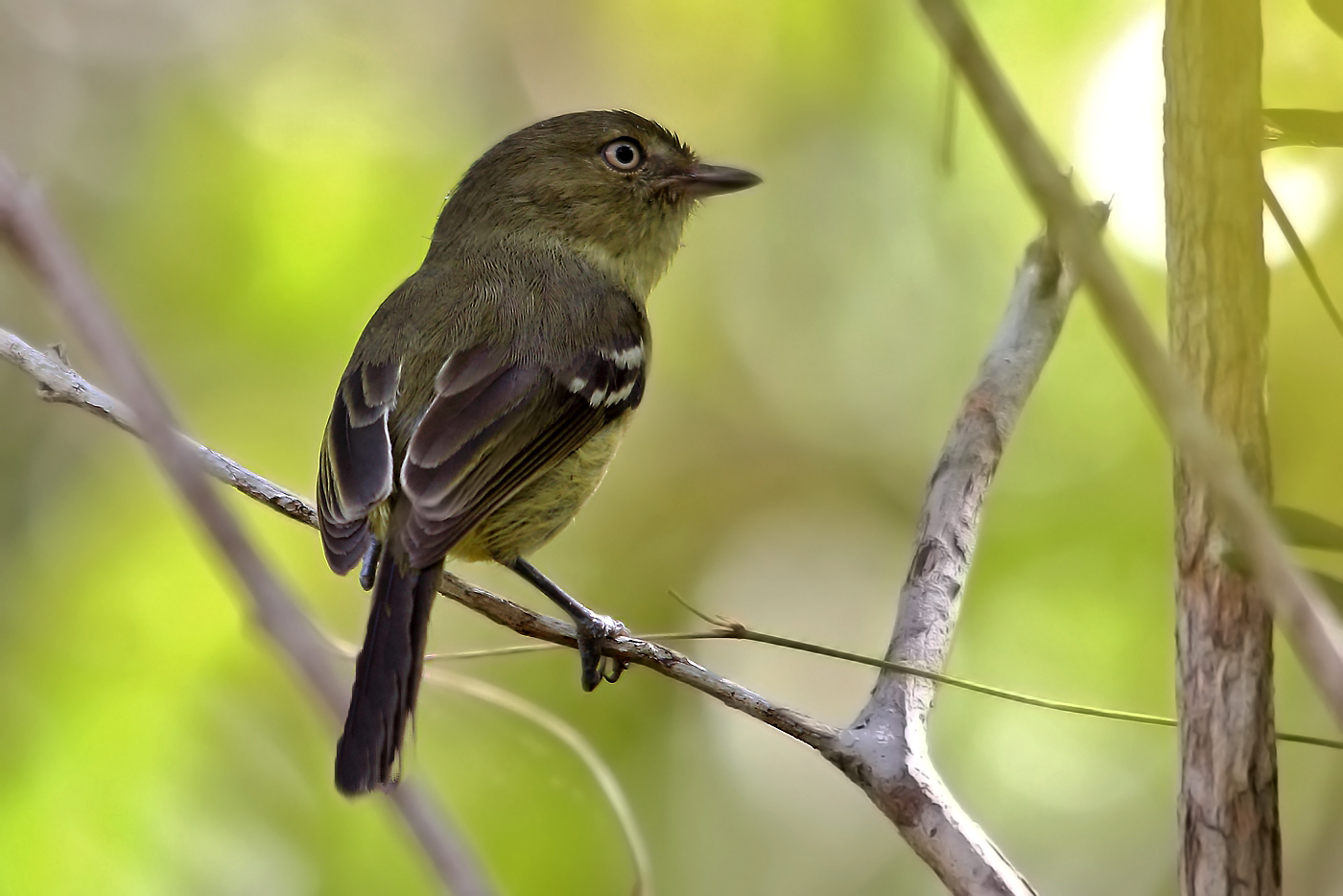
- In La Romana Province, Dominican Republic

Conservation status
- Least Concern (IUCN 3.1)

Scientific classification
- Kingdom: Animalia
- Phylum: Chordata
- Class: Aves
- Order: Passeriformes
- Family: Vireonidae
- Genus: Vireo
- Species: V. nanus

Binomial name
- Vireo nanus (Lawrence, 1875)

= Flat-billed vireo =

Species of bird endemic to Hispaniola

The flat-billed vireo (Vireo nanus) is a species of bird in the family Vireonidae, the vireos, greenlets, and shrike-babblers. It is endemic to the Caribbean island of Hispaniola that is shared by Haiti and the Dominican Republic.

== Taxonomy and systematics ==
The flat-billed vireo was originally described in 1875 as Empionax nanus, mistakenly placing it in the tyrant flycatcher family. It has sometimes been placed in its own genus Lawrencia.

The flat-billed vireo is monotypic.

== Description ==
The flat-billed vireo is 12 to 13 cm (4.7 to 5.1 in) long and weighs about 10 to 11 g (0.35 to 0.39 oz). The sexes have the same plumage. Adults have a greenish gray forehead, crown and nape, dark gray lores, a pale olive-yellow strip above the lores, and a broken olive-yellow eye-ring. Their upperparts are greenish gray. Their wing coverts are blackish gray with off-white tips that form two wing bars. Their flight feathers are a darker gray than the back; the primaries and secondaries have thin gray-green edges on the outer webs and the tertials have wider gray-green edges on both webs. Their tail is dull blackish gray with whitish tips on the outer feathers. Their throat and breast are grayish yellow, their belly and vent a brighter yellow, and their flanks grayish yellow. They have a white to gray iris, a laterally flattened triangular bill with a dark gray maxilla and a pale pinkish mandible, and bluish gray legs and feet. Juveniles have pale lores.

== Distribution and habitat ==
The flat-billed vireo has a disjunct distribution. It is found as several locations around the perimeter of Hispaniola and on the offshore Gonâve Island. The principal areas are along the northern and western coasts and in the Neiba Valley in the southwestern Dominican Republic. It primarily inhabits semi-arid scrublands though it is also found in more moist upland forest. In elevation it mostly ranges between sea level and 1,200 m (3,900 ft).

== Behavior ==
=== Movement ===
The flat-billed vireo is a sedentary year-round resident.

=== Feeding ===
The flat-billed vireo feeds on insects and fruits. It forages on the ground and in low vegetation, taking food by gleaning and sometimes taking insects in mid-air.

=== Breeding ===
The flat-billed vireo breeds between February and June. Its nest is an open cup made from plant fibers and placed in a shrub. The clutch is two eggs that are white with a few light gray markings. The incubation period, time to fledging, and details of parental care are not known.

=== Vocalization ===
The flat-billed vireo's song is a "[c]hattering, high-pitched weet-weet-weet- etc., often repeated". Its calls include a "harsh scolding note".

== Status ==
The IUCN has assessed the flat-billed vireo as being of Least Concern. Its population size and trend are not known. No immediate threats have been identified. It is considered "uncommon and local". It has "suffered considerable loss of habitat in recent times". The nest parasite shiny cowbird (Molothrus bonariensis) has been spreading on Hispaniola; its impact on the flat-billed vireo is unknown but "could have significant adverse effect".
