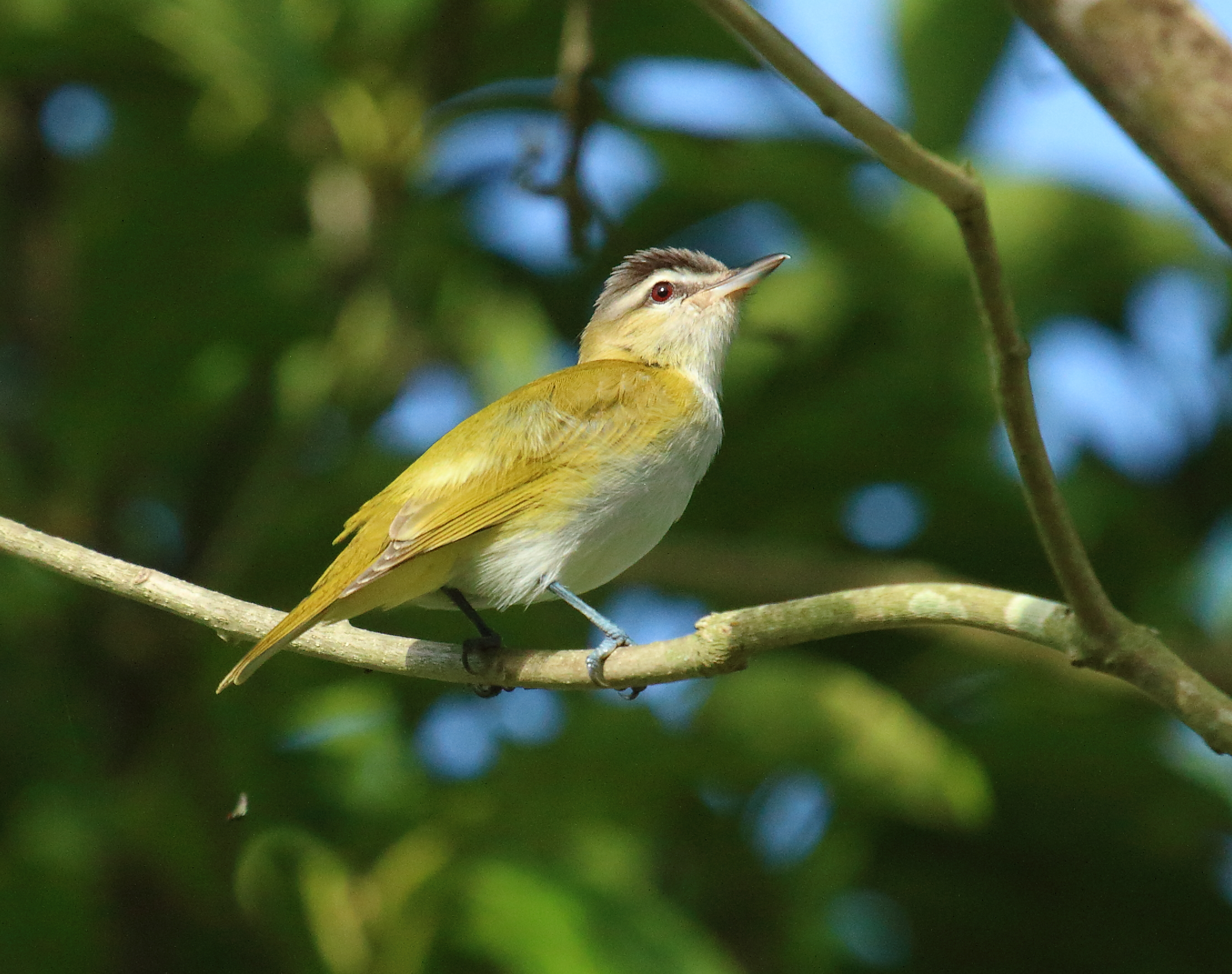
- A chivi vireo at Carlsen Field, Trinidad

Conservation status
- Least Concern (IUCN 3.1)

Scientific classification
- Kingdom: Animalia
- Phylum: Chordata
- Class: Aves
- Order: Passeriformes
- Family: Vireonidae
- Genus: Vireo
- Species: V. chivi

Binomial name
- Vireo chivi (Vieillot, 1817)
- Range of Chivi Vireo Non-breeding Breeding Year-round

Synonyms
- Vireo olivaceus chivi

= Chivi vireo =

Species of bird from South America

The chivi vireo (Vireo chivi) is a small South American songbird in the family Vireonidae. It was formerly considered a subspecies of the red-eyed vireo. It is usually green to yellow-green in color with off-white underparts, and a gray crown. It has a whitish supercilium extending over its ear coverts, and its lores are dull gray in color. The chivi vireo has nine subspecies. It is found throughout most of northern, eastern and central South America, only being absent from southern Chile and southern Argentina. It inhabits multiple types of habitat across its range, and appears to adjust well to slightly disturbed habitat. The chivi vireo is mainly resident, but at least two of the subspecies inhabiting the south of its range are known to be migratory.

The chivi vireo mates from May to June or October to January, depending on the region and subspecies. It makes cup nests and lay eggs in clutches of 2–4 which are incubated by the female, taking 10–16 days to hatch. Nestlings take 10–13 days to fully develop. The majority of the bird's diet is composed of arthropods, although some subspecies eat fruit and some are also thought to be nectarivorous.

== Taxonomy ==
The chivi vireo was described by the French ornithologist Louis Pierre Vieillot in 1817 and given the binomial name Sylvia chivi. The specific epithet is an onomatopoeia for its song, which Vieillot rendered as "chivi-chivi". Vieillot based his description on that for the "Gaviero" by the Spaniard Félix de Azara that had been published in 1802. Ornithologists previously treated the chivi vireo as a subspecies of the red-eyed vireo (Vireo olivaceus), but unlike the red-eyed vireo that migrates to North America, the chivi vireo remains in South America to breed and does not migrate. Based on a molecular phylogenetic study published in 2017 that found significant genetic differences and little introgression, the chivi vireo was promoted to species status.

=== Subspecies ===
There are 9 subspecies of the chivi vireo:

- V. c. chivi (Vieillot, 1817) – The nominate, it is found in west and southwest Amazonia and south to central Argentina. It weighs 10.9–15.5 g (0.38–0.55 oz), with a bill length of 11–13 mm (0.43–0.51 in) and a wing length of 66–72 mm (2.6–2.8 in).
- V. c. agilis (Lichtenstein, MHK, 1823) – Found in east Brazil south through to Rio de Janeiro. It weighs 14.0–14.5 g (0.49–0.51 oz). It is more brightly colored then the nominate, with a paler gray crown, the sides of the breast, flanks and vent being a brighter yellow.
- V. c. griseobarbatus (von Berlepsch & Taczanowski, 1884) – Found in west Ecuador and northwest Peru. It weighs 13 g (0.46 oz), with a bill length of 16–18 mm (0.63–0.71 in) in males and 17–19 mm (0.67–0.75 in) in females and a wing length of 62.5–71.5 mm (2.46–2.81 in). It tends to have a brighter green back than the nominate, with dark line bordering the crown and more yellow on the underparts, especially the flanks.
- V. c. caucae (Chapman, 1912) – Found in west Colombia, on the Pacific coast, the western slopes of the West Andes and the valleys of the upper Río Patía and Río Cauca. It looks similar to the nominate subspecies, but is darker with more grayish ear coverts.
- V. c. vividior Hellmayr & Seilern, 1913 – Found in Colombia, Venezuela, the Guianas, north Brazil and Trinidad. It weighs 12.8–21 g (0.45–0.74 oz), with a bill length of 12–13 mm (0.47–0.51 in) and a wing length of 71–75 mm (2.8–3.0 in). It has brighter yellow-green upperparts, with a relatively longer bill.
- V. c. solimoensis Todd, 1931 – Found in east Ecuador, northeast Peru and extreme west Brazil. It weighs 12.5–15.0 g (0.44–0.53 oz), with a bill length of 15–18 mm (0.59–0.71 in) in males and 16–17 mm (0.63–0.67 in) in females and a wing length of 60–68 mm (2.4–2.7 in). It is small, with a bright yellow behind, and the gray crown extending over to the hindneck.
- V. c. tobagensis Hellmayr, 1935 – Found in Tobago. It is a large subspecies, with a heavy bill and a darker back.
- V. c. diversus Zimmer, JT, 1941 – Found in east Paraguay, southeast Brazil, Uruguay and northeast Argentina. It weighs 15–17 g (0.53–0.60 oz), with a wing length of 68.0–76.5 mm (2.68–3.01 in). Looks similar to agilis, but has darker and duller upperparts, a brown-tinged back, and a mouse-gray on the top of the head. It is differs from chivi by having greener upperparts, flanks and sides, and a more yellow crissum (area surrounding the cloaca).
- V. c. pectoralis Zimmer, JT, 1941 – Found in north Peru, with a suspected population in Zamora-Chinchipe in southeastern Ecuador. Similar to griseobarbatus, but larger, with gray-tinged breast and throat and darker and duller green on the back.

== Description ==
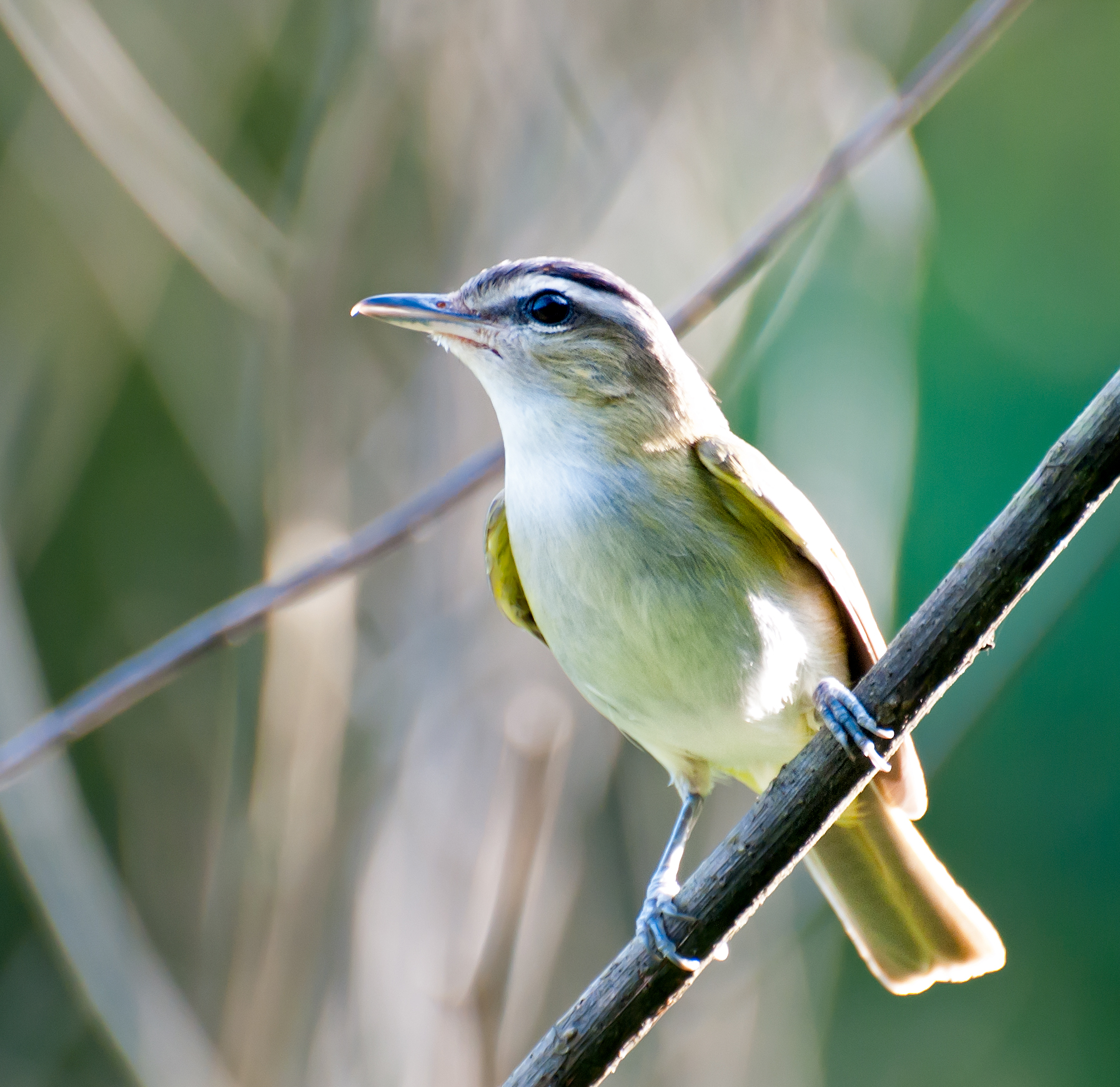
A chivi vireo in Sao Paulo, Brazil

The species looks similar to the related red-eyed vireo and yellow-green vireo. It is 12–14 cm (4.7–5.5 in) in length, with the mass and length of the bill and wings varying in different subspecies.

Hatchlings are born almost naked with yellow skin and sparse down. Juveniles have brownish or tawny (depending on subspecies) upperparts, with the greater and median coverts having brownish-green tips, and the head showing a less contrasting pattern than adults. The mouth lining is paler than adults up until 6 months of age. They may also show molt contrast on their wings.

Adult vireos are very similar, except in the subspecies diversus, where the female is smaller than the male. The crown is medium gray with thin but well defined gray borders, with a whitish supercilium extending above the ear coverts. The lores are a dull gray, and the nape, along with the side of the neck and the rest of the upperparts being a dull olive green. The area below the eyes is off-white in color. The wing coverts are dull gray brown, edged with olive green. The rectrices are green-gray in color, and have bright green edges. The undertail is very pale. The throat, breast, and belly are off-white or grayish-white in color, with a greenish tinge to the flank and sides of the breast. The upper mandible of the beak varies in color from black to blackish brown or a dusky gray, with the mandible being pale to blue-gray in color with a dark tip and paler base. The iris is brown in color, although it varies in shade from pale brown to reddish brown. The legs are pale brown to pale gray in color.

=== Calls ===
The calls of the species are typical of most of Vireo, but it has a very simple repertoire with only one song and one vocalization. Its song is a pattern of brief musical sound with pauses in between. The song of the South American subspecies is usually "chew-lee chew-lew wee-chee chew leee", while the song of griseobarbatus is a "tche-wit ... tche-wut" repeated constantly during the breeding season. solimoensis is said to have a shorter and more repetitive song, while the song of the migratory populations in the south of the range is said to more complex than that of resident subspecies. In Bolivia, the song is said to be composed of "chee’wee? chee’wip" repeated. The principal call is a raspy "zheer", or a more nasal "jeeyr", with the warning call being "gweh" or "greh".

== Distribution and habitat ==
This bird is very widespread across most of northern, eastern, and central South America, with the exception of southern Chile and southern Argentina. Resident populations of the chivi vireo occur across northeastern Colombia, into Venezuela and the entirety of the Guianas into eastern Brazil. They also occur alongside many rivers in Amazonia, continuing into parts of Peru, Bolivia and Ecuador, with some resident populations inhabiting western Colombia. More migratory populations are found in south and southeastern Brazil, Paraguay, Bolivia, and Uruguay, along with the northern areas of Argentina. In the non-breeding season these populations travel north as far as Venezuela, eastern Colombia, eastern Ecuador, and eastern Peru.

It inhabits the canopy and subcanopy of dry to wet forests, along with borders, light woodland, restinga, gallery forest in the cerrado, dense scrub, small tree groves, and secondary growth with tall trees. It inhabits semi-deciduous, várzea and secondary forests in Peru, ascending into montane valleys in the south. In central Amazonian Brazil, the bird is not common in mature forests, with these habitats being inhabited by migrant red-eyed vireos. It has been recorded up to an elevation of 1,900 m (6,200 ft) in Bolivia and 2,600 m (8,500 ft) in Peru, but is usually only found up to an elevation of 1,500 m (4,900 ft) in Colombia and Brazil, and up to an elevation of 1,300 m (4,300 ft) in Ecuador. It can also inhabit highly disturbed and modified habitats as long as tall trees are present.

== Ecology and behavior ==
The species is largely resident throughout its range, but in the south of its range, the subspecies chivi and diversus are known to be migratory. There are also some subspecies that are likely to undertake short migrations.

=== Diet and foraging ===
The species is primarily an insectivore, but some populations are known to consume fruit, and they may be important seed dispersers for some plants. It mainly consumes arthropods, especially caterpillars and other insect larva. They have been recorded consuming fruits of Myrsine coriacea, Rapanea lancifolia, Myrsine ferruginea, Trichilia spp., Cabralea canjerana, Talauma ovata, Davilla rugosa, Nectandra megapotamica, Byrsonima sericea, Miconia minutiflora, Cupania emarginata and oblongifolia, Zanthoxylum rhoifolium, Trema micrantha, Alchornea glandulosa, and Pera glabrata. It is thought to be an important seed disperser for Cabralea canjerana. It is also suspected of being nectarivorous.

=== Reproduction ===
The species nests in the austral spring in the south of its range, and in the middle of the year in the north. The populations in Venezuela, Tobago, and Colombia nest in May–June, while the populations of the nominate subspecies in Peru have been seen nesting in November. Brazilian populations are thought to nest in October–January.

Nests of vividior are generally built in a cup shape out of grass, vegetable fibers, and small amounts of plant down in a tree fork, while nests of griseobarbatus are cup-shaped structures built out of dry weeds, vines, and bark and lined with black lichen, feathers, and seed down. The nests of griseobarbatus had an external height and depth of 50 mm and 77 mm, with an internal height and depth of 31 mm and 52 mm.

Eggs are laid in clutches of 2–4 at a time. Eggs vary in appearance and size between different subspecies. The mean size of eggs in griseobarbatus is reported to be 22.0 mm × 13.1 mm (0.87 in × 0.52 in), while that size of eggs in Brazil is 20.32 mm × 14.65 mm (0.800 in × 0.577 in), and the size of eggs in Argentina being 18.5 mm–19.0 mm × 13.0 mm–14.5 mm (0.73 in–0.75 in × 0.51 in–0.57 in). The average mass of eggs measured in southeastern Brazil was 2.27 g (0.080 oz).

Eggs of vividior are white with some blackish spots on the larger end of the egg. Eggs of griseobarbatus are said to be white with sparse and faint markings. Eggs in eastern Brazil have been described as white. The eggs in northeastern Argentina have been described as being white and having gray or fine chestnut markings and dark lines which were concentrated at the larger end. The incubation period of the eggs is reported as being 10–16 days. Only females incubate the eggs. The nests are probably parasitized by shiny cowbirds. Eggs might also be eaten by snakes as one nest in Ecuador was observed being predated on by a snake. The nestling period is 10–13 days, and young are dependent on parents for a while after they have fledged.

== Status ==
The chivi vireo is listed as a least concern species by the IUCN. The species is common across its large range, and seems to have a stable population. The population may also be increasing locally. Also, its acceptance of disturbed habitat increases its chances of survival.
