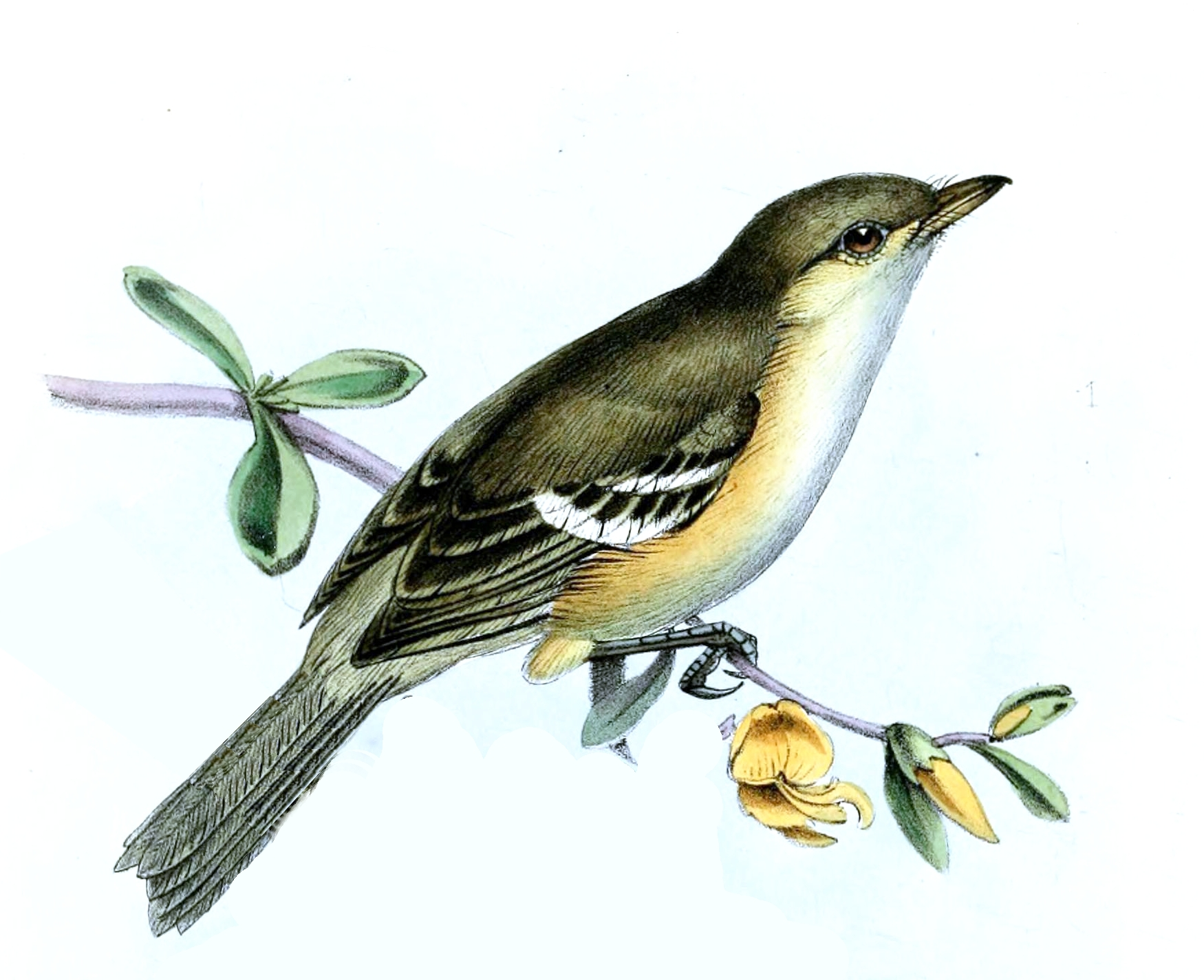

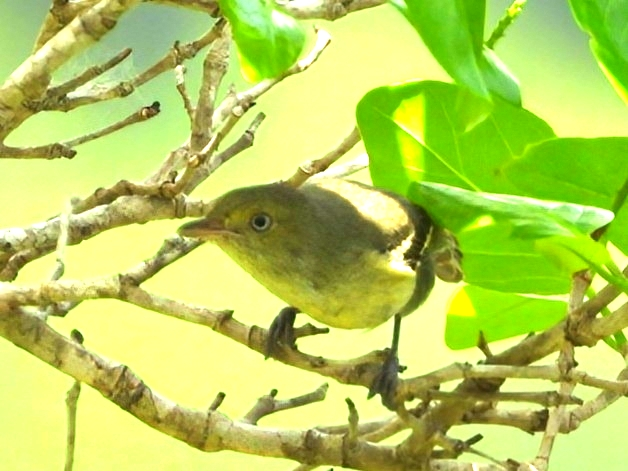

Conservation status
- Least Concern (IUCN 3.1)

Scientific classification
- Kingdom: Animalia
- Phylum: Chordata
- Class: Aves
- Order: Passeriformes
- Family: Vireonidae
- Genus: Vireo
- Species: V. modestus

Binomial name
- Vireo modestus PL Sclater, 1861

= Jamaican vireo =

Species of bird

The Jamaican vireo (Vireo modestus) is a species of bird in the family Vireonidae, the vireos, greenlets, and shrike-babblers. It is endemic to Jamaica.

== Taxonomy and systematics ==
The Jamaican vireo was originally described in 1861 as Vireo modestus, its current binomial. It is monotypic.

== Description ==
The Jamaican vireo is about 12.5 cm (4.9 in) long and weighs about 9 to 10 g (0.32 to 0.35 oz). The sexes have the same plumage. Adults have a mostly greenish olive to grayish olive head with yellowish olive gray above the lores and on the chin and throat. Their upperparts are greenish olive to grayish olive with a slightly brighter rump. Their wing coverts are brownish gray with wide yellowish white tips that form two wing bars. Their primaries and secondaries are dusky to grayish with paler olive green outer edges and whitish inner edges. Their breast is yellowish gray, their belly brighter yellow gray, and their sides and flanks pale greenish olive. They have a gray iris, a gray maxilla, a lighter, sometimes pinkish, mandible, and grayish blue legs and feet. Juveniles have grayer heads and more brownish olive upperparts than adults, with buffier yellow underparts.

== Distribution and habitat ==
The Jamaican vireo is found across the island country of Jamaica. It primarily inhabits moist to humid tropical deciduous forest and more arid lowland forest. However, it also occurs in almost any available forest type including lowland and montane evergreen and secondary forests. It typically shuns mangroves, marshes, and tree plantations. Sources differ on its elevational range. One states it is from sea level to 2,000 m (6,600 ft) and two others give a range of sea level to 1,500 m (4,900 ft).

== Behavior ==
=== Movement ===
The Jamaican vireo is a sedentary year-round resident.

=== Feeding ===
The Jamaican vireo feeds on insects and fruits in roughly an 85% to 15% ratio. It typically forages in pairs in dense foliage in the forest understory to mid-story. I takes about half of its insect prey from leaves, another quarter from twigs, and the rest from other vegetation and minimally in mid-air. When gleaning it sometimes hangs upside-down.

=== Breeding ===
The Jamaican vireo breeds mostly between April and June. Its nest is an open cup made from various plant materials and covered with lichens, and is suspended in a branch fork. The clutch is two eggs that are white with dark brown markings. The incubation period, time to fledging, and details of parental care are not known.

=== Vocalization ===
The Jamaican vireo's song is highly variable but in general is rapid and high pitched; a phrase is repeated for several minutes and then changed. "Individual notes within phrases are often clear, slurred whistles, but phrases can also include scolding sounds or modulated notes." Phrases have been written as sewi-sewi and wee-weet-weet-wuu.

== Status ==
The IUCN has assessed the Jamaican vireo as being of Least Concern. It has a relatively small range; its population size is not known but is believed to be stable. No immediate threats have been identified. It is considered "widespread and common". "[The] Jamaican Vireo can adapt to some habitat modification [and] has a relatively low sensitivity to human activity compared to other Neotropical birds".
