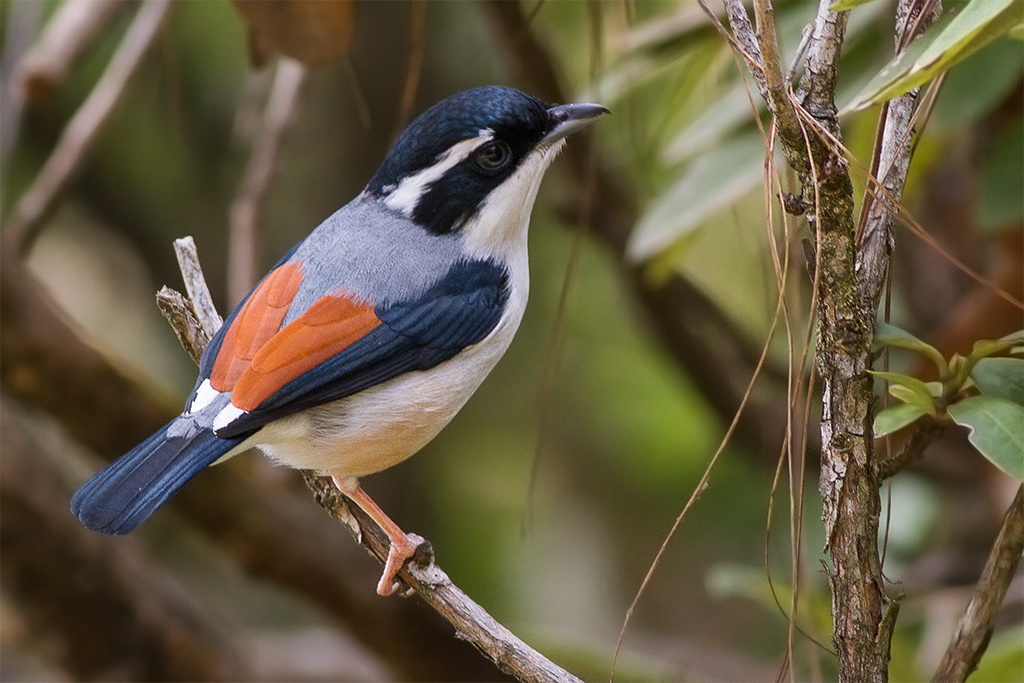
- Male in Paharpani, Uttarakhand, India

Scientific classification
- Kingdom: Animalia
- Phylum: Chordata
- Class: Aves
- Order: Passeriformes
- Family: Vireonidae
- Genus: Pteruthius
- Species: P. aeralatus
- Subspecies: P. a. ripleyi

Trinomial name
- Pteruthius aeralatus ripleyi Biswas, 1960
- A rough distribution of the taxa within the species complex

= Himalayan shrike-babbler =

Species of bird

The Himalayan shrike-babbler (Pteruthius aeralatus ripleyi) is a bird subspecies found in the western Himalayas that belongs to the shrike-babbler group. The genus was once considered to be an aberrant Old World babbler and placed in the family Timaliidae until molecular phylogenetic studies showed them to be closely related to the vireos of the New World, leading to their addition in the family Vireonidae. Males and females have distinctive plumages, with the males being all black about with a cinnamon-rufous tertial patch and a distinctive white stripe running from behind the eye. The underside is whitish with some pinkish buff on the flanks. Females have a greyish head, lack the white stripe and have the upperparts and wings with greens, yellow and chestnut. The subspecies is part of a cryptic species complex that was earlier considered as one species, white-browed shrike-babbler (P. flaviscapis in the broad sense) with several subspecies.

== Description ==
Adult males have a black head and a greyish back. A white superciliary stripe begins just above and behind the eye, extending back down the sides of the nape. The throat and underside are whitish. The inner edges and tips of the primaries are white, the tertiaries (the three inner secondaries) are uniformly orange-chestnut, unlike dark chestnut in P. a. validirostris. The flanks have a hint of pale pink and grey. The grey on the back is lighter than the shade in validirostris. The bill is black and hooked at the tip. The adult female is olive brown above with the wing coverts edged grey. The secondaries are edged with olive green and the outer three primaries are tipped in white on the inner edge. The tertiaries are uniformly chestnut. Both males and females are paler than P. a. validirostris. The tail is black. The outer tail feathers are olive green and tipped in yellow with the inner webs black. The central tail feathers are olive green with a black tip. The underside is whitish buff as in the male but washed with grey from the middle of the abdomen to the vent.

== Taxonomy ==
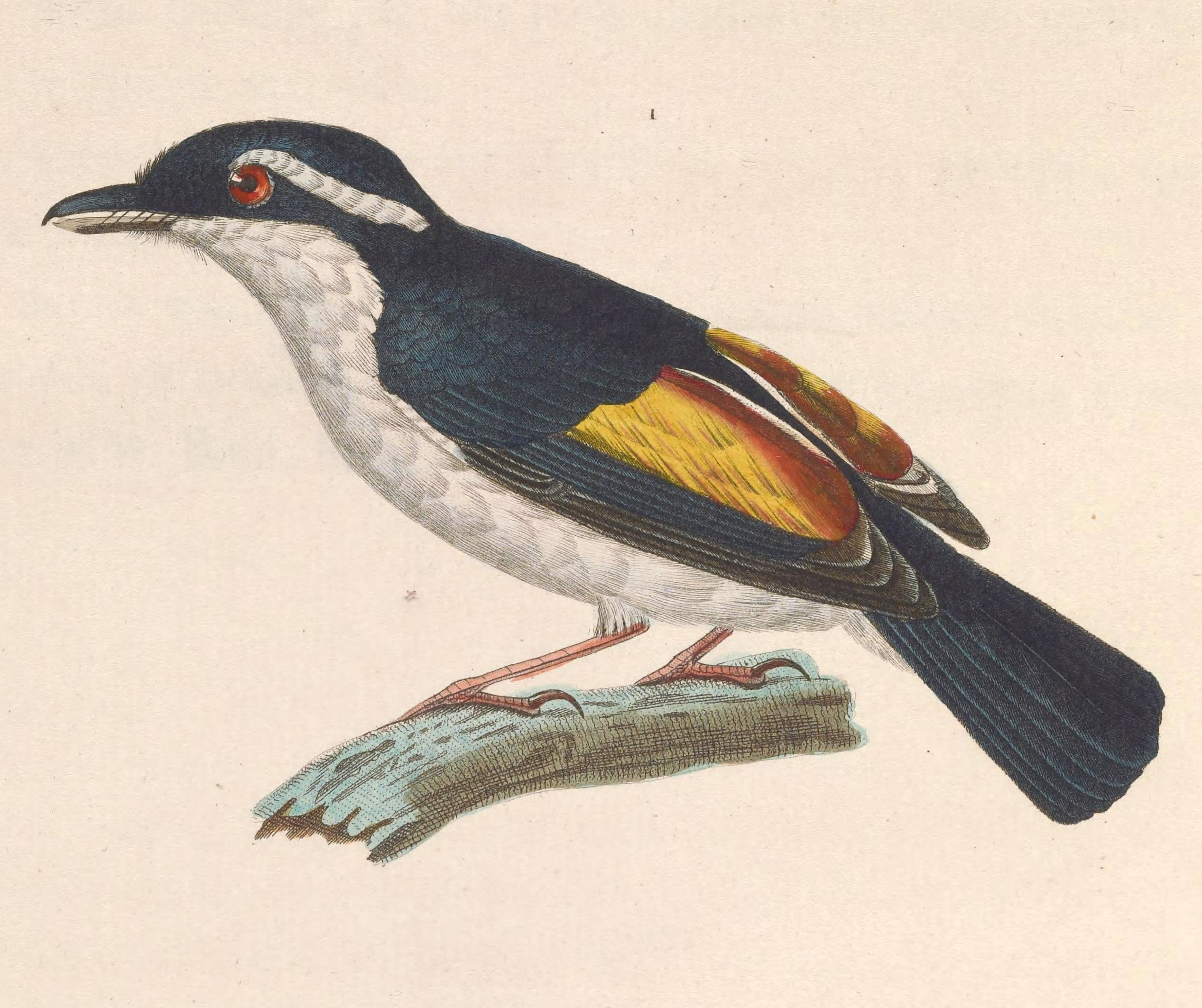
Pteruthius flaviscapis of Java

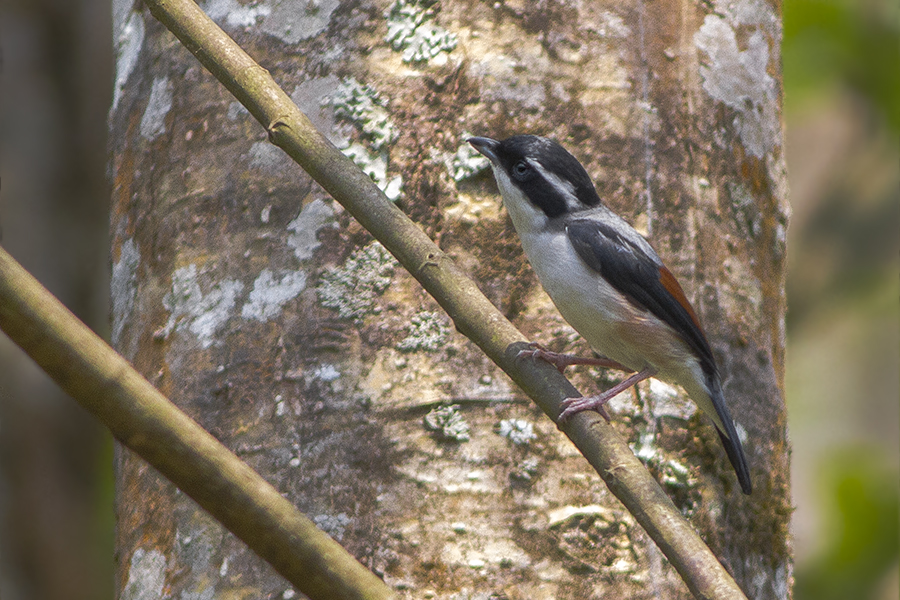
Male white-browed shrike-babbler (P. aeralatus validirostris) from Neora Valley National Park

The taxonomic history of this subspecies is complex. It was originally described by Nicholas Aylward Vigors in 1831 who described the bird based on a specimen from Murree in Pakistan. He called it Lanius erythropterus and the subspecies was later moved out of the genus Lanius used only for true shrikes and placed in the genus Pteruthius as P. erythropterus. In 1951, Koelz described a new subspecies from Nagaland under the name of Pteruthius erythropterus validirostris. In 1960, Biswamoy Biswas noted that the name Lanius erythropterus was "preoccupied" or clashing with an earlier name used by Shaw in 1809 for a different species and he therefore suggested that the western Himalayan species should be renamed as a subspecies ripleyi after elevating Koelz's name for the eastern Himalayan form to the rank of a species. Temminck described a similar and related species from Java in 1835 as Allotrius flaviscapis and this too was moved to the genus Pteruthius. The subspecies validirostris, which then included ripleyi, along with many other forms in the region were lumped as subspecies of Pteruthius flaviscapis by Ernst Mayr and R.A. Paynter in their taxonomic treatment in 1964. This was followed by most regional works such as the Handbook of the Birds of India and Pakistan by Salim Ali and Dillon S. Ripley. In 2008, a study of the Pteruthius group found that the relationships within the groups here were more complex than earlier thought and one of the findings was that the subspecies validirostris of the eastern Himalayas was more closely related to the forms found further to the east in Southeast Asia and far more distant to the form in the western Himalayas. This led to the elevation of the western form as Pteruthius ripleyi with validirostris being made a subspecies of Pteruthius aeralatus Blyth's shrike-babbler.

== Distribution ==
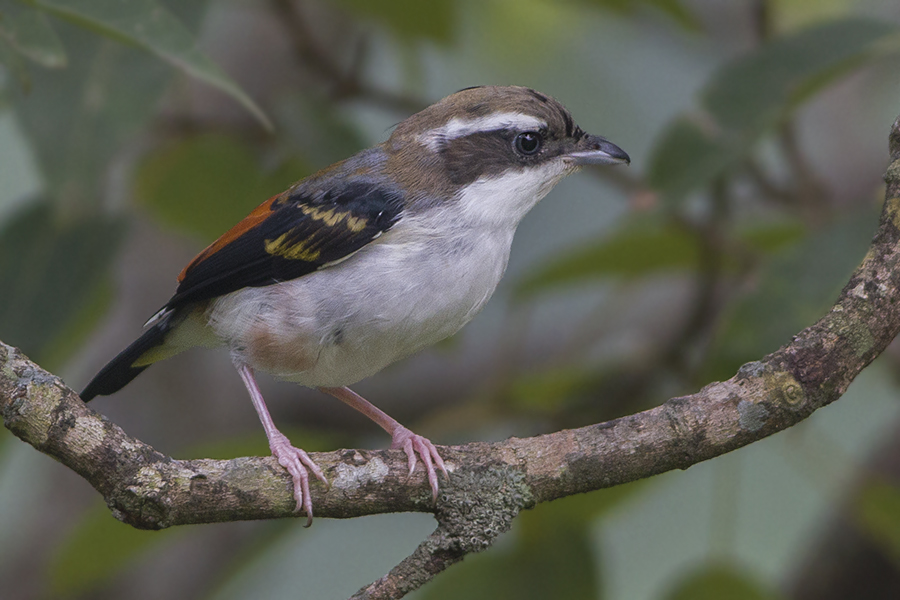
Immature male from Pangot

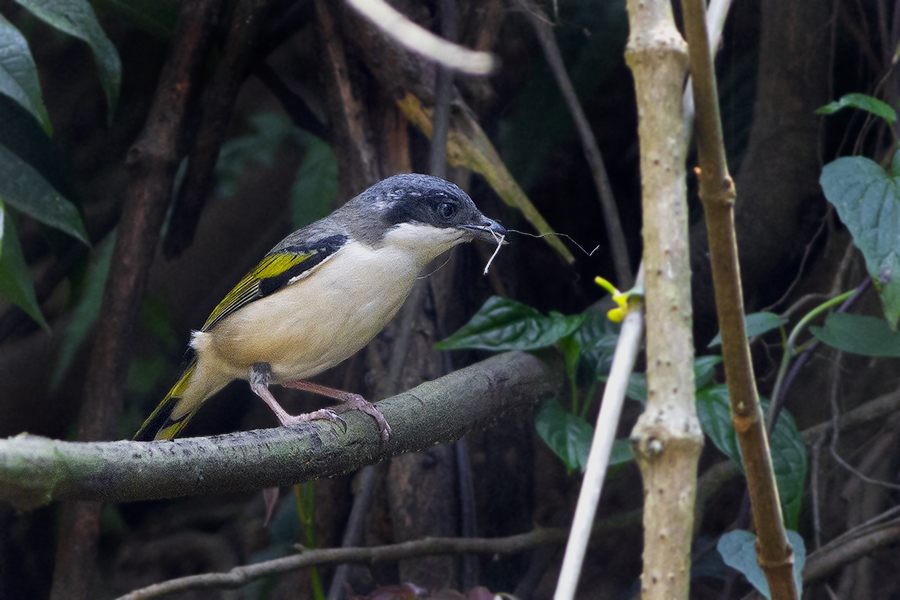
Female (♀) from Neora Valley National Park, West Bengal.

The subspecies is found in the western Himalayas from northern Pakistan and extending east through India into central Nepal and possibly further east. The eastern limits of the species are unclear but some evidence based on song differences suggests that they might occur as far east as Arunachal Pradesh. This might be negated if it is found that song variations exist within the eastern form Pteruthius aeralatus validirostris of Blyth's shrike-babbler.

== Behaviour ==
Himalayan shrike-babblers are strictly arboreal and are seen foraging for insects mainly in the upper canopy. During the breeding season they are found in pairs but at other times several birds may be found, often in mixed-species foraging flocks. They also feed on berries, hopping along branches and sometimes hanging like a nuthatch. They sometimes sit still and will call often. The call being a series of loud kewkew kwekew repeated three or four times and the song from February to June transcribed as cha-chew, cha-ca-chip. The nest is a hammock, like that of an oriole, built in a fork towards the tip of a branch high in the canopy of a tree. The clutch varies from two to four eggs which are pinkish white and speckled in purple brown, the spots merging to form a ring towards the broad end.
