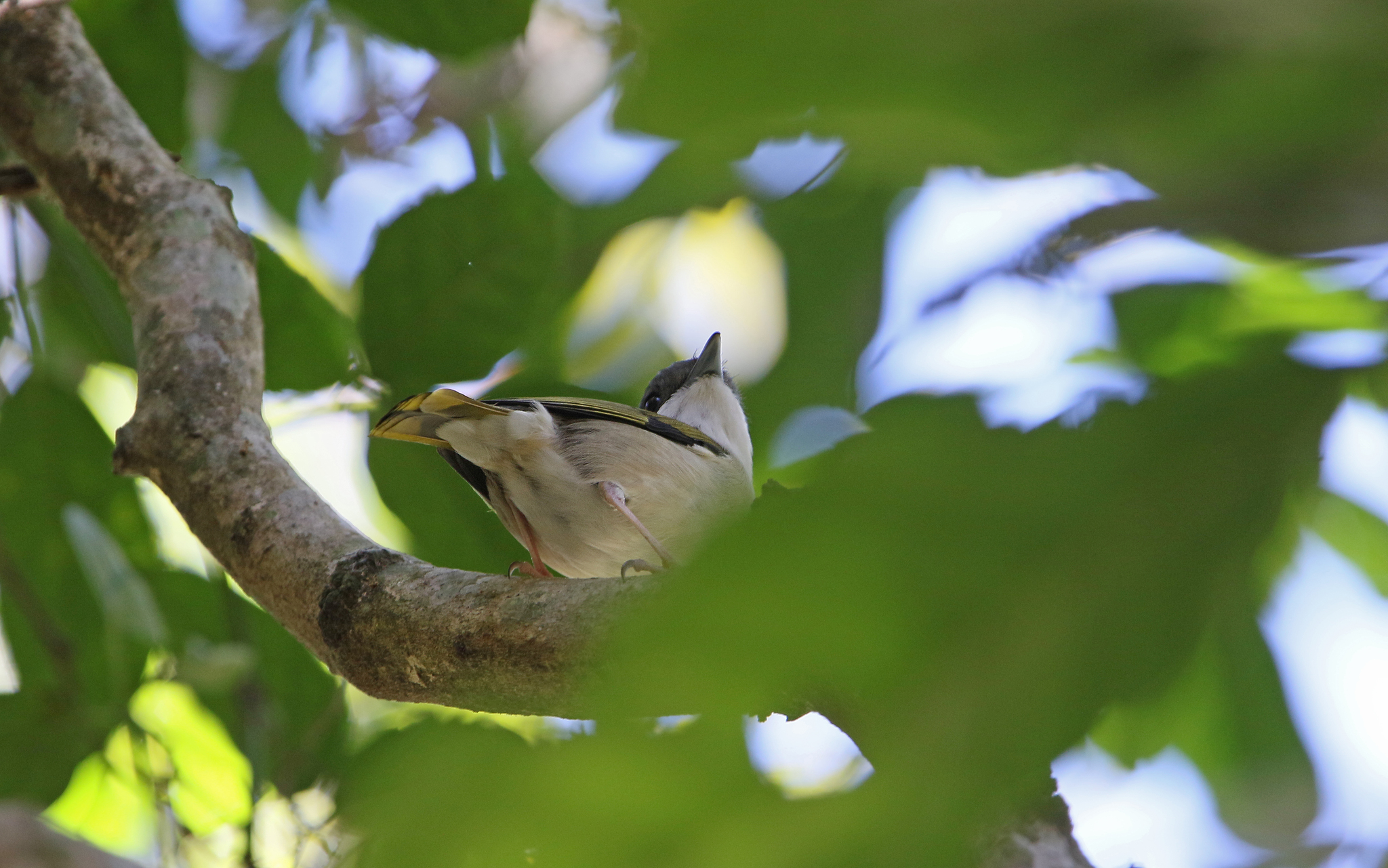

Scientific classification
- Kingdom: Animalia
- Phylum: Chordata
- Class: Aves
- Order: Passeriformes
- Family: Vireonidae
- Genus: Pteruthius
- Species: P. aeralatus
- Subspecies: P. a. annamensis

Trinomial name
- Pteruthius aeralatus annamensis (Robinson & Kloss, 1919)
- Rough distribution of the taxa within the complex

= Dalat shrike-babbler =

Subspecies of bird

The Dalat shrike-babbler (Pteruthius aeralatus annamensis) is a bird subspecies traditionally considered an aberrant Old World babbler and placed in the family Timaliidae. But as it seems, it belongs to an Asian offshoot of the American vireos and may well belong in the Vireonidae. Indeed, since long it was noted that their habits resemble those of vireos, but this was believed to be the result of convergent evolution.

It is endemic to southern Vietnam on the Da Lat Plateau. It is considered a subspecies of the white-browed shrike-babbler.
