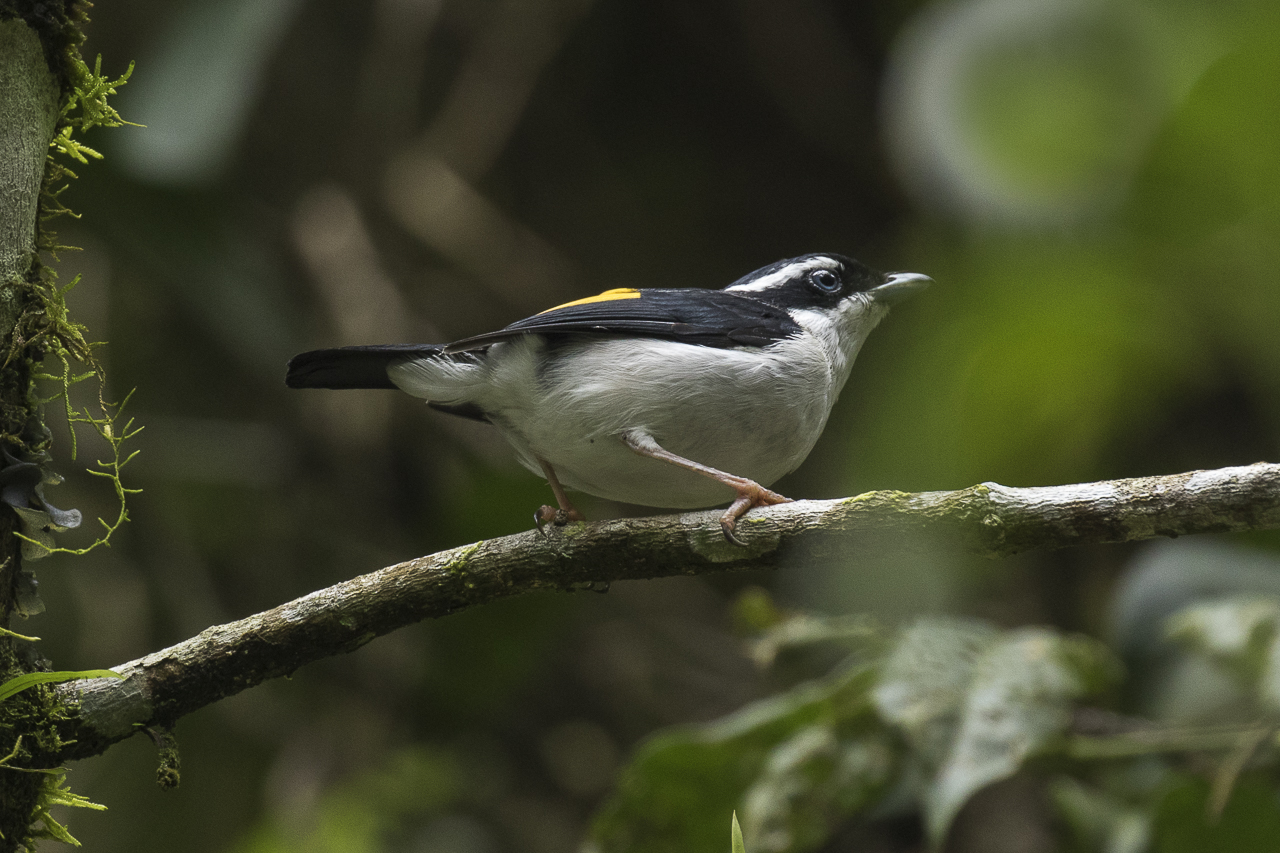

Conservation status
- Least Concern (IUCN 3.1)

Scientific classification
- Kingdom: Animalia
- Phylum: Chordata
- Class: Aves
- Order: Passeriformes
- Family: Vireonidae
- Genus: Pteruthius
- Species: P. flaviscapis

Binomial name
- Pteruthius flaviscapis (Temminck, 1836)

= Pied shrike-babbler =

Species of bird

The pied shrike-babbler (Pteruthius flaviscapis) is a bird species traditionally considered an aberrant Old World babbler and placed in the family Timaliidae. But as it seems, it belongs to an Asian offshoot of the American vireos and may well belong in the Vireonidae. Indeed, since long it was noted that their habits resemble those of vireos, but this was believed to be the result of convergent evolution. It was formerly considered a subspecies of the white-browed shrike-babbler.

It is native to western and eastern Javan montane rain forests.

Females are paler, with yellow-olive wings and a finer eyebrow.
