= Chestnut-fronted shrike-babbler =

Chestnut-fronted shrike-babbler has been split into two species:

- Trilling shrike-babbler, Pteruthius aenobarbus
- Clicking shrike-babbler, Pteruthius intermedius
