= Intermediate parakeet =

Scientific classification
- Kingdom: Animalia
- Phylum: Chordata
- Class: Aves
- Order: Psittaciformes
- Family: Psittaculidae
- Genus: Psittacula
- Species: P. intermedia

Binomial name
- Psittacula intermedia (Rothschild, 1895)

Synonyms
- Psittacula himalayana × Psittacula cyanocephala; Trichoglossus haematodus subsp. intermedius; Psittacula cyanocephala

Species of bird

The intermediate parakeet (Psittacula intermedia) or Rothschild's parakeet was a kind of parakeet reported from the sub-Himalayan region of India and was described on the basis of about seven undated specimens. Similar individuals have been noted in captivity and the type specimen is now believed to be a hybrid between Psittacula himalayana and Psittacula cyanocephala. More recent captive specimens that appeared similar were found to be hybrids produced by crosses between Psittacula krameri and Psittacula cyanocephala. An analysis of the characters of the specimens suggests that the originally described P. intermedia was a hybrid between P. cyanocephala x P. himalayana.

== Description ==
This parakeet has never been seen in the wild. Six of the seven specimens are considered to show signs of captivity. The characters are intermediate between the cyanocephala and himalayana with considerable variation among the specimens.

The intermediate parakeet is 36 cm long, wing length 15 - 16 cm, tail length 16.5 - 19.5 cm.

This is a mainly yellowish-green parrot with a slaty-purple head bordered below by a broad black cheek stripe which becomes a narrow band across nape. The forehead back to the eye area has a pink-purple tinge. There is a reddish-brown patch on the wing-coverts. The tail feathers are purple with yellowish-white tips, and yellow undersides. The upper mandible is reddish with a yellow tip, and the lower mandible yellowish.

The female has a smaller red wing patch, and more slaty head.
