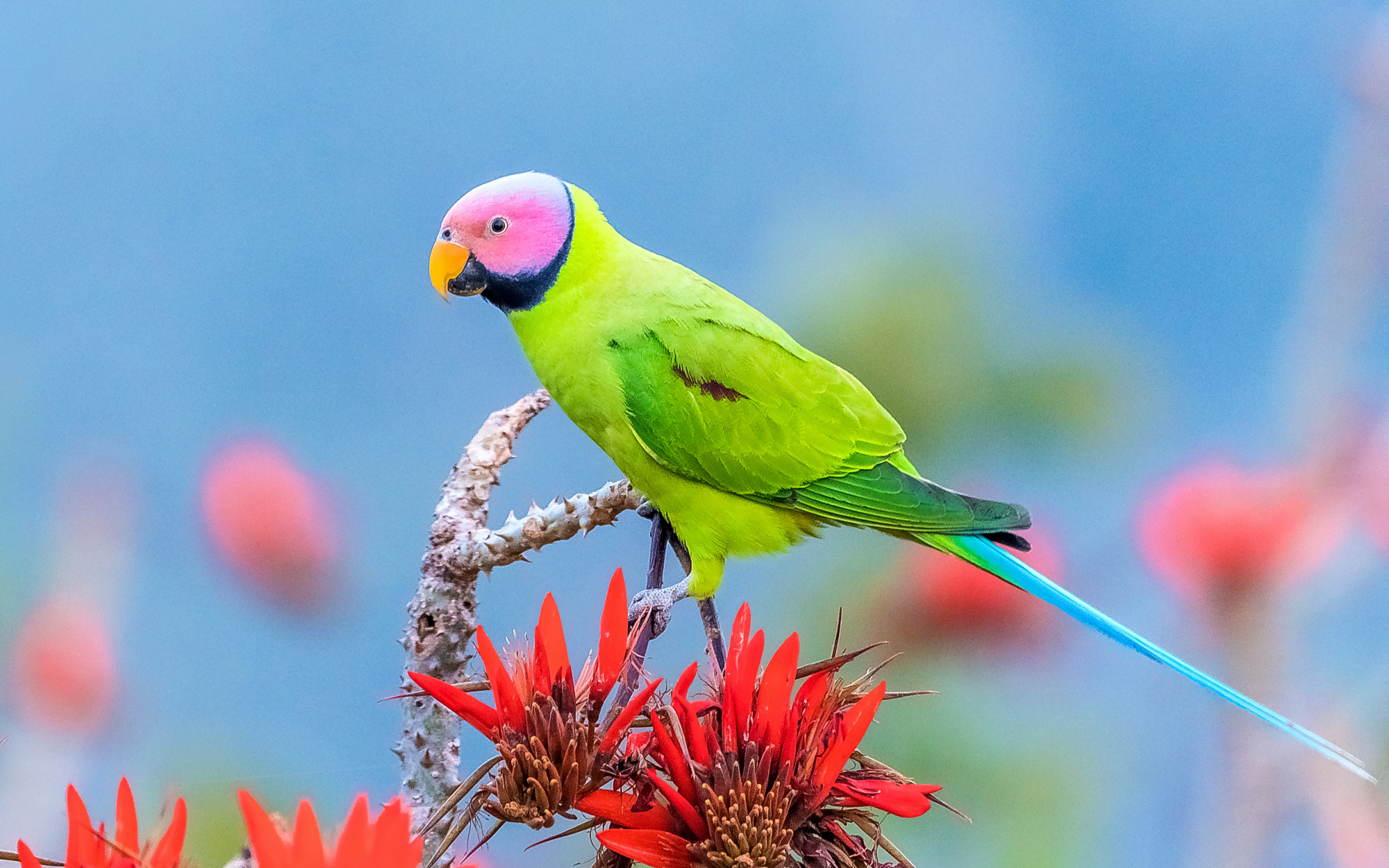

Conservation status
- Near Threatened (IUCN 3.1)
- CITES Appendix II

Scientific classification
- Kingdom: Animalia
- Phylum: Chordata
- Class: Aves
- Order: Psittaciformes
- Family: Psittaculidae
- Genus: Psittacula
- Species: P. roseata

Binomial name
- Psittacula roseata Biswas, 1951

Synonyms
- Himalayapsitta roseata Biswas, 1951

= Blossom-headed parakeet =

Species of bird

The blossom-headed parakeet (Psittacula roseata or Himalayapsitta roseata) is a parrot in the family Psittaculidae. It has a lime green body and a pink or bluish grey-head and is found in Southeast Asia. This species is sometimes also referred to as rosy-headed parakeet.

== Description ==
P. roseata is a lime-green parrot, 30 cm (12 in) long with a tail up to 18 cm (7.1 in). It weighs on average 2.9-3.1 oz (85-90 g).

The male's head, cheeks, and ears are pink becoming pale blue towards the back of the crown and nape. There is a narrow black neck collar and a black chin stripe. There is a reddish brown shoulder spot on the inner middle wing coverts. Long, central tail feathers are blue and tipped with pale yellow. Side tail feathers are yellow green and tipped with pale yellow. The upper mandible is orange yellow, and the lower mandible is a dark grey. Eyes are pale yellow.

The female P. roseata differs with a pale blue grey head and the black neck collar is instead yellow green. The red shoulder spot is smaller among females, the upper mandible is yellow, and the lower bill is a dark grey.

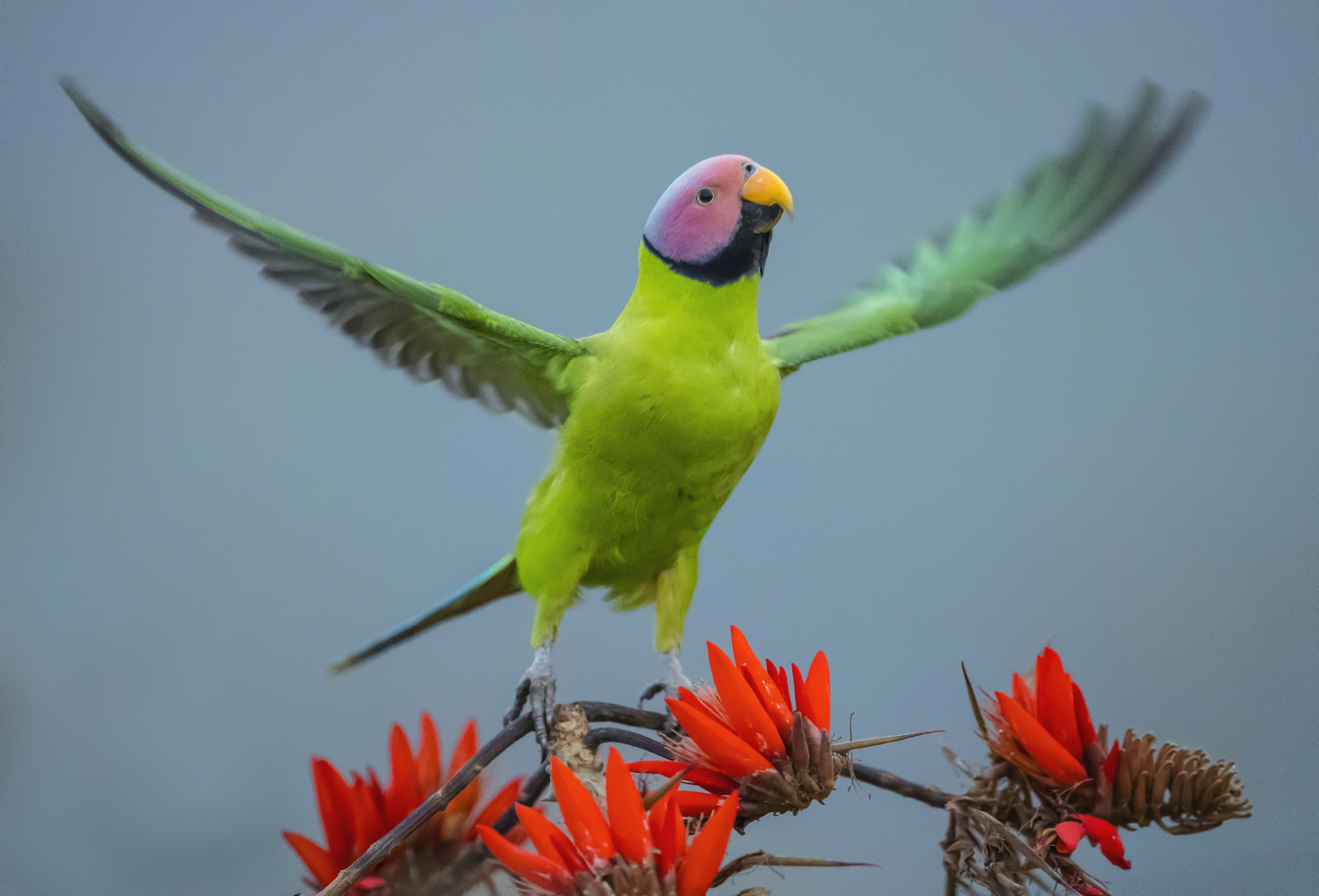
Male P. roseata in Satchari National Park, Bangladesh (2019)

P. r. juneae, a subspecies, is similar in description to P. r. roseata, except it has a more yellowish plumage and the red wing patch is larger. The central tail feathers are paler in colour and the side tail feathers are yellower.

Immature and juvenile birds have a green head and a grey chin. Both mandibles are yellowish and there is no red shoulder patch. Juvenile birds have grey eyes.

The different head colour and the yellow tip to the tail distinguish this species from the similar plum-headed parakeet (H. cyanocephala).

== Taxonomy ==
The Psittacula genus, introduced in 1800 by naturalist Georges Cuvier, includes 16 species of parrots and parakeets. The genus name Psittacula is derived from the Latin word psittacus, or "parrot". Biswamoy Biswas, an Indian ornithologist, was credited as the authority on this species in 1951 due to his contributions researching the birds of Nepal and Bhutan.

- Psittacula
- - Blossom-headed parakeet, Psittacula roseata
  - - Plum-headed parakeet, Psittacula cyanophala
    - - Slaty-headed parakeet, Psittacula himalayana
      - Grey-headed parakeet, Psittacula finschii

Alternate phylogeny of the genus Himalayapsitta based on a study by Michael Braun and coworkers published in 2019.

A revised classification of the genus by Michael Braun and coauthors in 2019 split the genus into multiple monophyletic genera. The proposed monophyletic genus, Himalayapsitta, includes the plum-headed parakeet, grey-headed parakeet, slaty-headed parakeet, and the blossom-headed parakeet. This taxonomic system is currently followed by the IUCN Red List.

Two subspecies of the blossom-headed parakeet are recognized:

- P. r. roseata - Biswas, 1951 – West Bengal (India) to Bangladesh
- P. r. juneae - Biswas, 1951 – Northeast India and North Myanmar to Indochina

== Distribution and habitat ==
This species is a resident breeder in Southeast Asia. The range expands from eastern Bangladesh, Bhutan, northeast India and Nepal, eastwards into Cambodia, Laos, Myanmar, Thailand, Vietnam, and also China. It is a non-migratory bird and lives year-round in the same range.

The blossom-headed parakeet inhabits lowland and foothill open forests. It occurs in altitudes around 1500m and in light forests such as savannas, secondary growth forests, forest edges, clearings, and cultivated areas. In Thailand, the blossom-headed parakeet is common in cultivated land and forest outskirts.

== Behaviour and ecology ==
The blossom-headed parakeet nests in holes in trees, laying 4-5 white eggs. It undergoes local movements, driven mainly by the availability of the fruit and blossoms which make up its diet. The species is normally found moving in small flocks or in family groups, and often in the company of moustached parakeets.

Blossom-headed parakeet class are described as having a range of raucous calls, sometimes being gregarious and noisy or soft and melodic much like the plum-headed parakeet (P. cyanocephala).

== Breeding and captivity ==
Although uncommon in overseas aviculture, this species has been historically kept in captivity for importation into Europe. It is trapped and sold illegally as a cage bird, such as at Chatuchak Weekend Market in Bangkok, Thailand. Blossom-headed parakeets are generally non-aggressive to other captive birds.

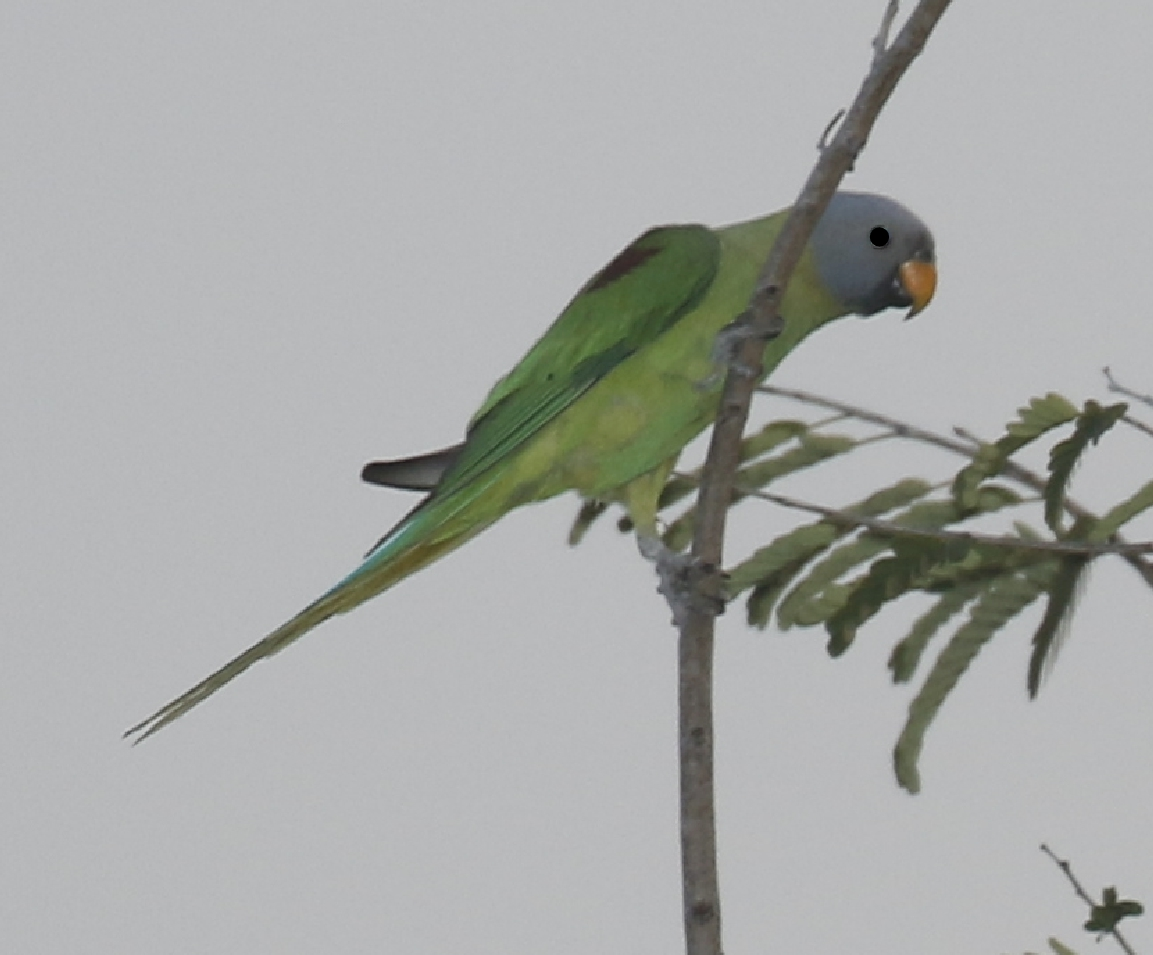
Female blossom-headed parakeet near Inthanon Highland Resort, Thailand (2016)

In 1879, aviculturist Dr. Karl Russ was the first person to record a successful breeding attempt with the blossom-headed parakeet. As in the wild, the species lays a clutch of two to four eggs which are incubated by the hen. Incubation lasts around 24 days and newly hatched birds remain in the nest for seven to eight weeks.

Millet, oats, and canary and sunflower seeds are recommended staple diets for captive blossom-headed parakeets. Young parakeets consume a soaked seed mix, green food, and fruit in large amounts.

== Threats and conservation ==
The blossom-headed parakeet was classified as near threatened by the IUCN Red List in 2013 because of its moderately rapid decline from trapping and habitat loss. While populations are stable or declining slowly in its range in India and Thailand, populations in Laos and Vietnam have declined very rapidly over the past three decades.

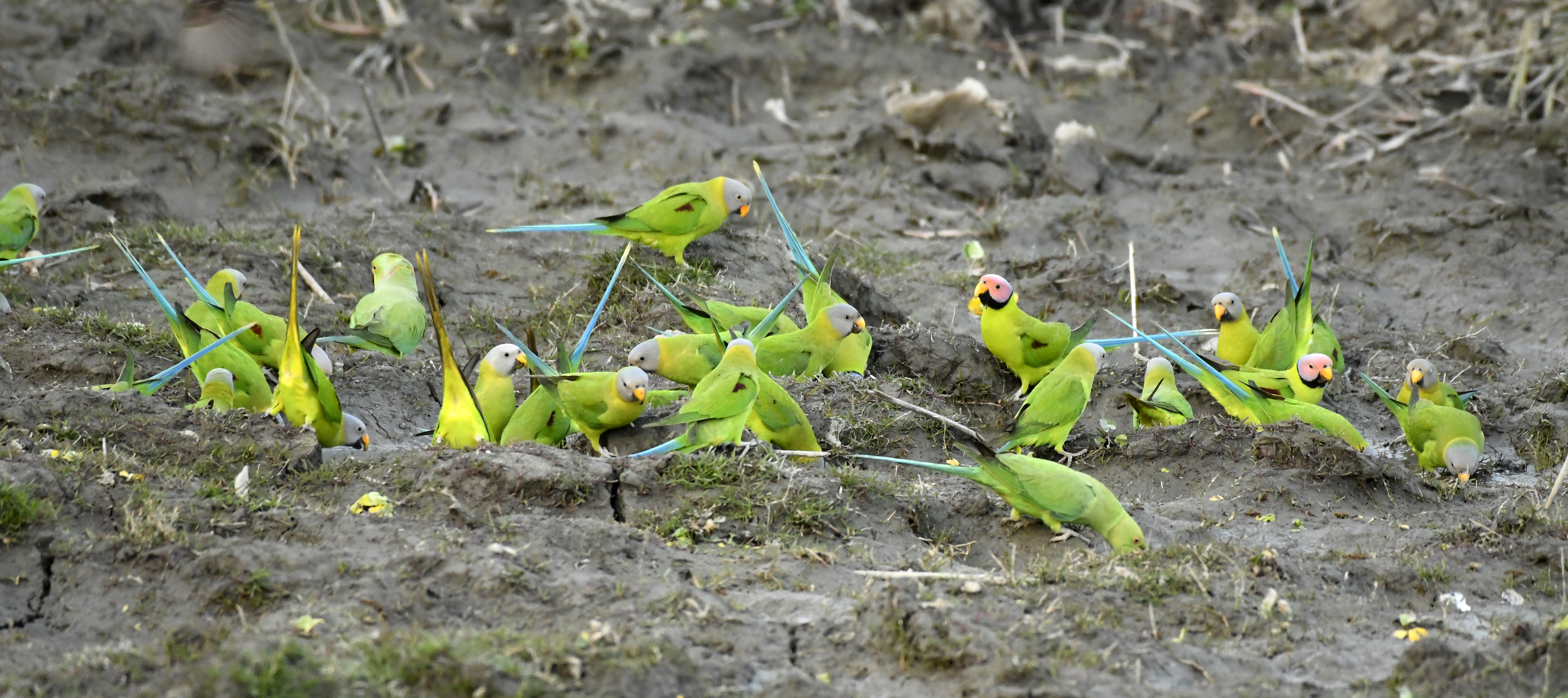
P. roseata in Kaziranga National Park, Northeast India (2020)

The species is vulnerable to habitat loss especially in degraded lowland deciduous dipterocarp forests. Human pressures such as agricultural land conversion, hunting, and climate change increase disturbances to blossom-headed parakeet habitats. Parakeet species are also highly impacted by poaching and trapping for the cage-bird trade.

Blossom-headed parakeets commonly frequent farm edges and rural villages in flocks of 20 to 30 birds, causing damage to agricultural crops. The species was found to be the highest contributor to depredation of marigold crops in a 1994 study in India. The parakeets preferred to feed from flowers near perching sites and away from human activity.

== Bibliography ==
- Grimmett, Inskipp y Inskipp, Birds of India ISBN 0-691-04910-6
- Josep del Hoyo, Andrew Elliott, Jordi Sargatal (Hrsg.): Handbook of the Birds of the World. Volume 4: Sandgrouse to Cuckoos. Lynx Edicions, Barcelona, 1997. ISBN 8487334229
- Joseph Michael Forshaw: Parrots of the World - An Identification Guide. Princeton University Press, Princeton 2006, ISBN 978-0-691-09251-5.
