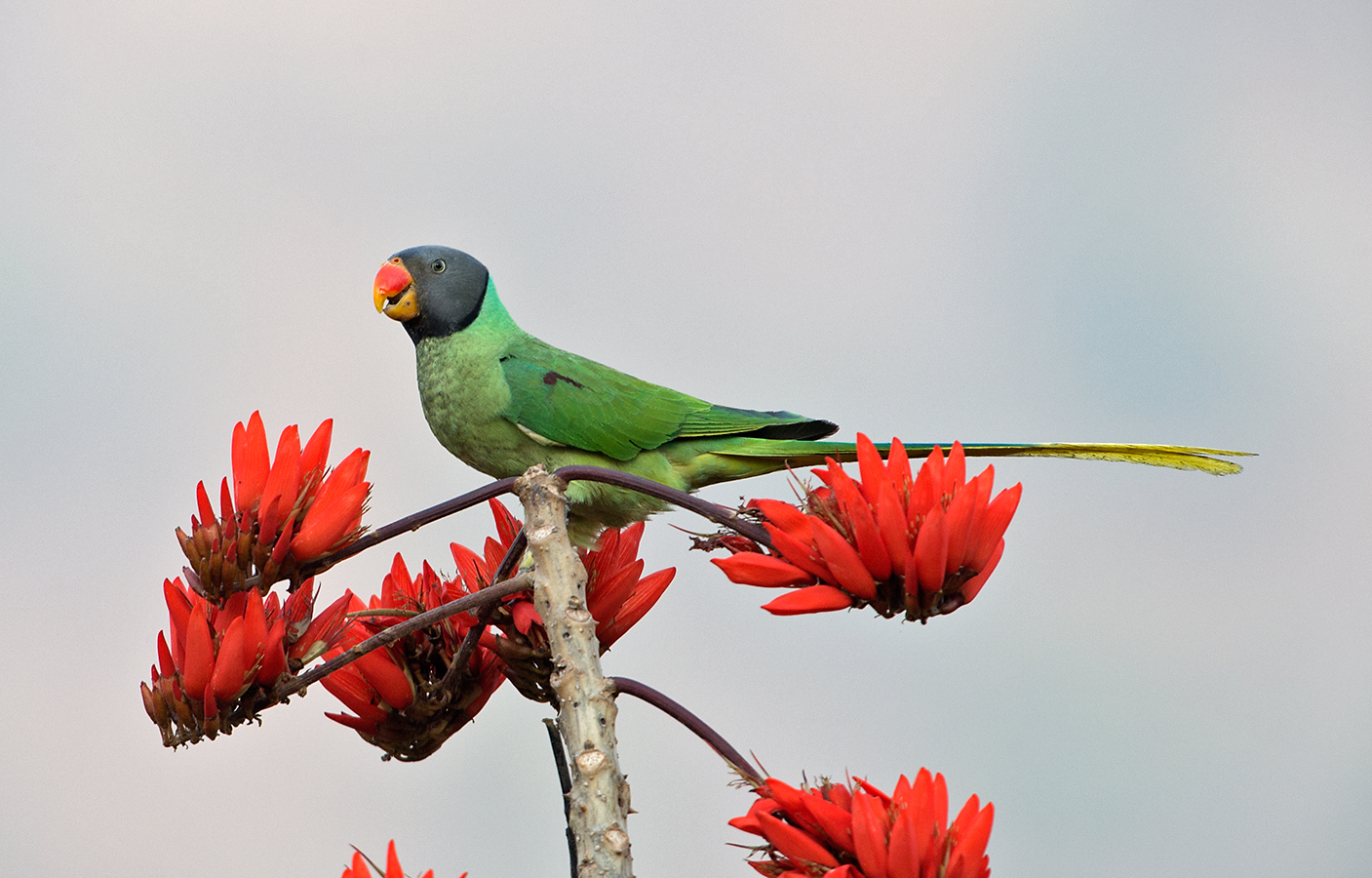

Conservation status
- Least Concern (IUCN 3.1)
- CITES Appendix II

Scientific classification
- Kingdom: Animalia
- Phylum: Chordata
- Class: Aves
- Order: Psittaciformes
- Family: Psittaculidae
- Genus: Psittacula
- Species: P. himalayana

Binomial name
- Psittacula himalayana (Lesson, RP, 1831)

Synonyms
- Himalayapsitta himalayana

= Slaty-headed parakeet =

Species of bird

The slaty-headed parakeet (Psittacula himalayana) is the only psittacid species to exhibit altitudinal migration. The species' range extends from Pakistan, to Western Himalayas in India through Nepal and Bhutan and up to the Eastern Himalayas in the northeastern Indian state of Arunachal Pradesh. They descend to the valleys in winter, approximately during the last week of October.

== Description ==
Adults of both sexes have green (tinted with blue) feathers on most of their body. It has a dark grey (slate colored) head with a light blue tint where head meets the neck. Males feature dark maroon patches on inner wing coverts. Females do not feature these maroon patches. Males have long central tail feathers which are shorter in female birds. The tail is green at base and becomes deep blue and widely tipped with bright yellow. The parakeet features a bright red-orange upper mandible with a pale yellow lower. It also has a pale yellow eye.

== Distribution and population ==
The slaty-headed parakeet has a wide range throughout the Himalayas and surrounding areas. This bird is found is western Bhutan, most of Nepal, and in the following the Indian states; Sikkim, Uttarakhand, Himachal Pradesh,(southern) Jammu and Kashmir. It is can also be found in a small area north of Islamabad and in the southern areas of the Federally Administered Tribal Areas in Pakistan. The bird can also be found in small pockets of mountainous areas in the provinces of Kabul, Logar, Nangarhar, and Paktia in Afghanistan.

== Ecology and behavior ==
The species is usually found at elevations of 460–2400 meters in its natural habitat of highland/hillside forest and valley woodlands. They are usually observed in small flocks or family groups in search for their diet of various fruits (wild and agriculturally grown), nuts, pine nuts, seeds, nectar, and acorns. Multiple larger flocks are usually seen near the end of the wet season, where they descend into the valleys for most of winter. It is common for to see them mingle with other parakeet species such as the rose-ringed parakeet, plum-headed parakeet, and blossom-headed parakeet. Females usually lay 4-5 eggs of about 28.5 x 22 mm. The eggs incubate for approximately 23–24 days before hatching. In their Afghanistan range, this bird will often nest in abandoned nest cavities of the scaly-bellied woodpecker, and these species may nest in close proximity to each other for security against predators. The slaty-headed parakeet usually breeds within the months of March–May. It has as typical lifespan of 15–17 years.

Its habit of associating with plum-headed parakeets might occasionally bring about hybrid offspring. Birds intermediate in appearance between P. himalayana and P. cyanocephala were once assumed to be a distinct species "intermediate parakeet" and scientifically described as Psittacula intermedia in the 1890s, but most such specimens known today are in fact deliberately captive-bred hybrids.
