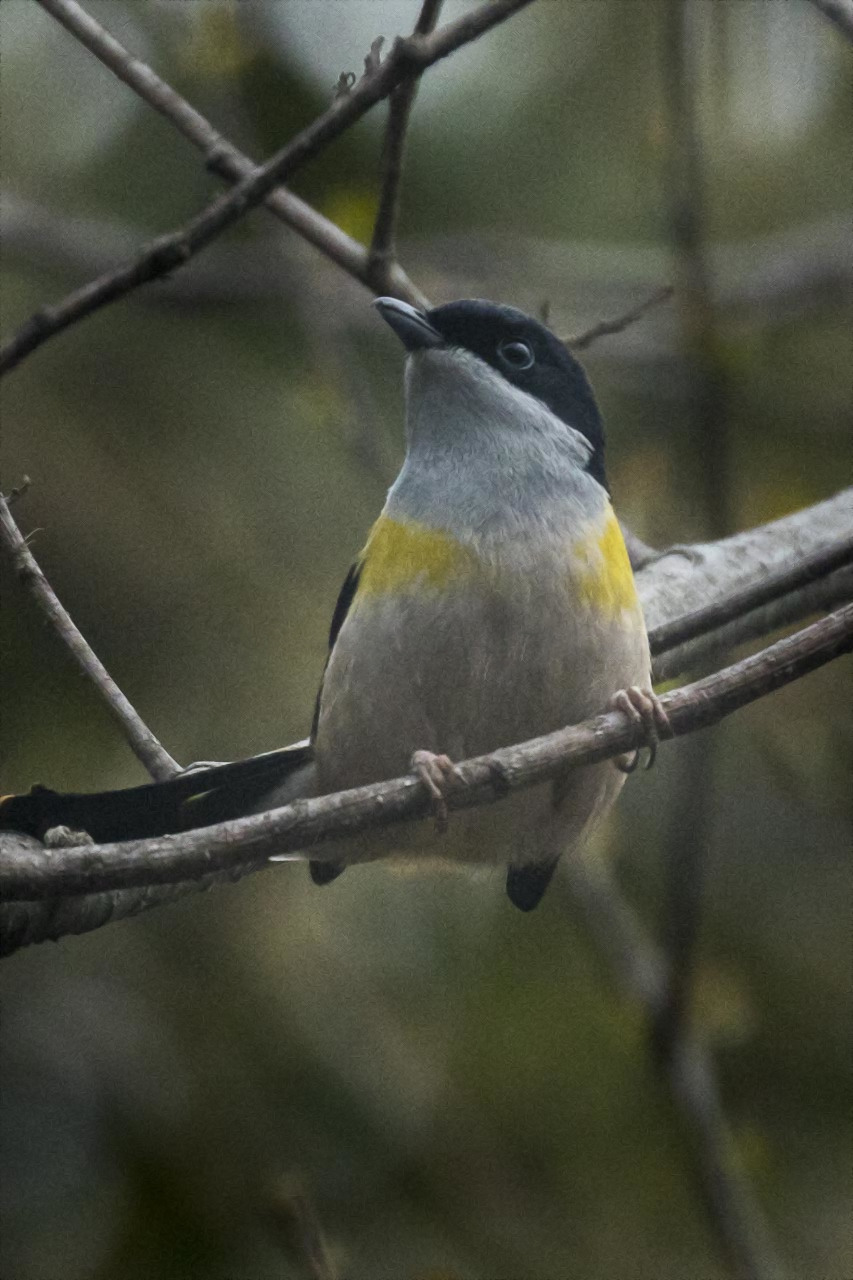

Conservation status
- Least Concern (IUCN 3.1)

Scientific classification
- Kingdom: Animalia
- Phylum: Chordata
- Class: Aves
- Order: Passeriformes
- Family: Vireonidae
- Genus: Pteruthius
- Species: P. rufiventer

Binomial name
- Pteruthius rufiventer Blyth, 1842

= Black-headed shrike-babbler =

Species of bird

The black-headed shrike-babbler (Pteruthius rufiventer) is a bird species traditionally placed with the Old World babblers in the family Timaliidae. However, it might be one of the few Eurasian vireos (Vireonidae).

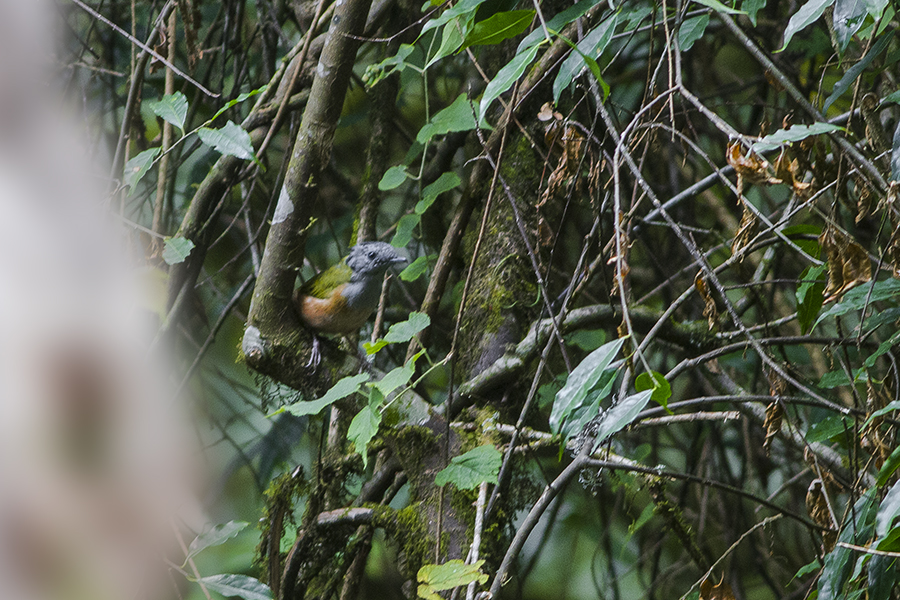
Pteruthius rufiventer from Khangchendzonga National Park, West Sikkim, Sikkim, India.

It is found in an area that ranges from eastern Nepal to northwestern Vietnam. Its natural habitat is subtropical or tropical moist montane forests.
