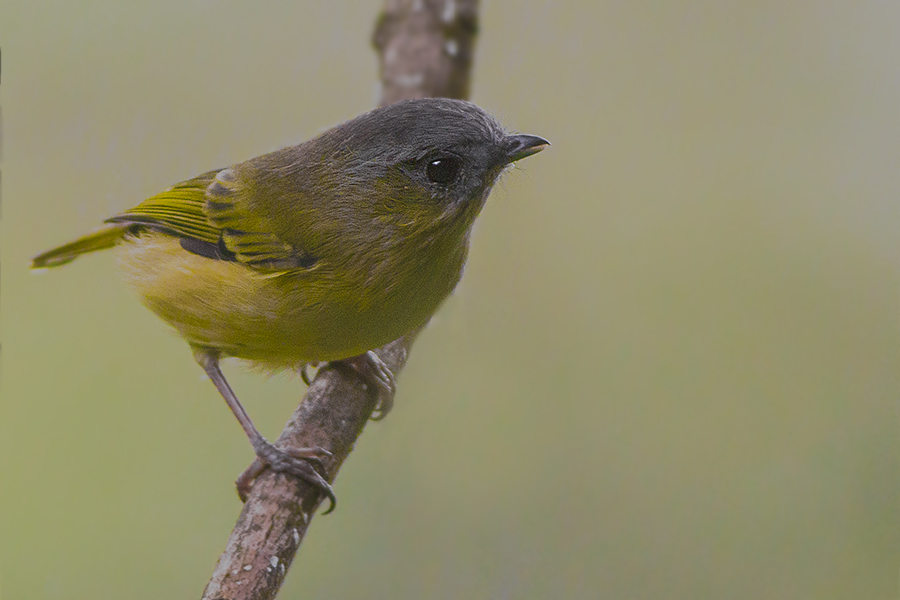
- from Khangchendzonga National Park, West Sikkim, India.

Conservation status
- Least Concern (IUCN 3.1)

Scientific classification
- Kingdom: Animalia
- Phylum: Chordata
- Class: Aves
- Order: Passeriformes
- Family: Vireonidae
- Genus: Pteruthius
- Species: P. xanthochlorus

Binomial name
- Pteruthius xanthochlorus Gray, JE & Gray, GR, 1847

= Green shrike-babbler =

Species of bird

The green shrike-babbler (Pteruthius xanthochlorus) is a bird species that was earlier placed in the family Timaliidae. The species is now considered to be an Asian offshoot of the American vireos and belongs in the family Vireonidae.

== Description ==
This species is about 13 centimeters in length. The male bird has a grey head, with olive-green on its back. Its throat and breast are a pale ashy grey color, with a yellow belly. The crown is blackish. The female bird is slightly duller than the male and has a greyish crown.

== Distribution and habitat ==
It is found in Bhutan, China, India, Myanmar, Nepal, Pakistan, and Vietnam. Its natural habitat is subtropical or tropical moist montane forests. This species is usually found in deciduous and coniferous forests, at altitudes of 2100–3000 meters above sea level, during most seasons. However, they may descend to lower altitudes in winter. In India, the species is found in Darjeeling, Sikkim, Uttrakhand and Arunachal Pradesh.

== Diet ==
The diet consists of insects such as ants and beetles as well as berries and seeds.

== Breeding ==
The breeding season is mainly May and June. The nests are usually found about three to eight meters above the ground.

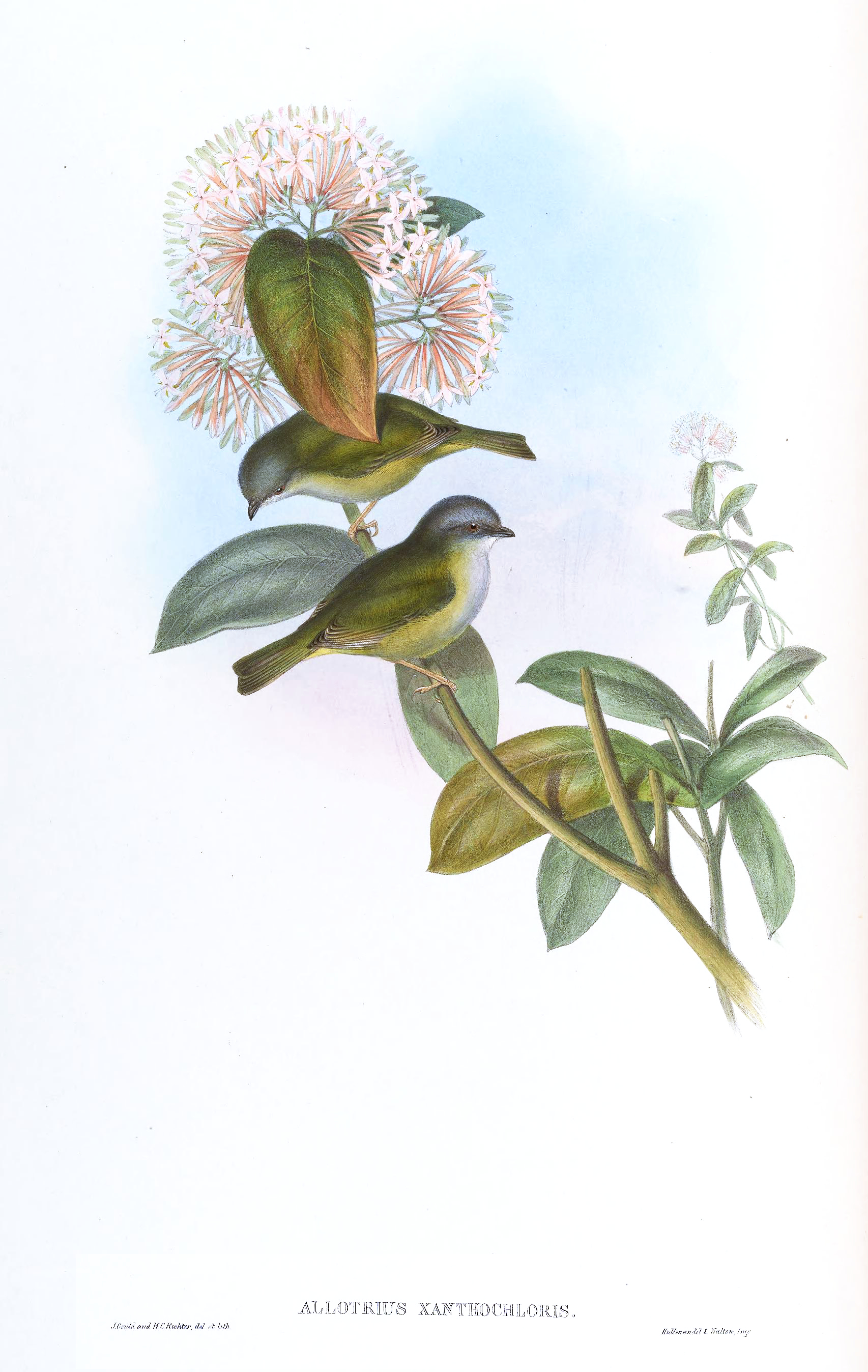
Illustration of the Pteruthius Xanthoclorus(Green shrike-babbler) by John Gould
