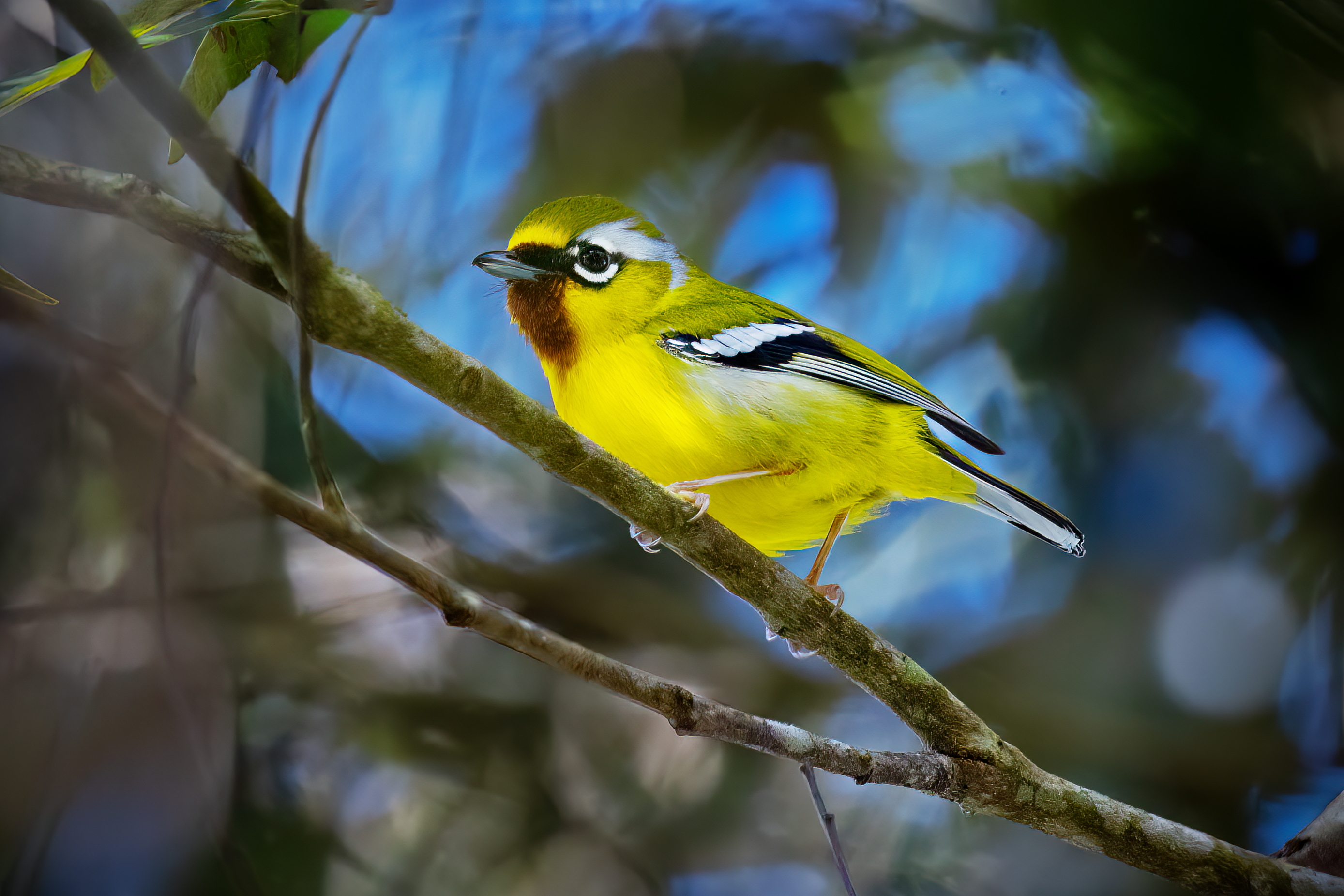

Scientific classification
- Kingdom: Animalia
- Phylum: Chordata
- Class: Aves
- Order: Passeriformes
- Family: Vireonidae
- Genus: Pteruthius
- Species: P. intermedius

Binomial name
- Pteruthius intermedius (Hume, 1877)

= Clicking shrike-babbler =

Species of bird

The clicking shrike-babbler (Pteruthius intermedius) is a species of bird in the family Vireonidae. It is found from Assam, India, eastern Myanmar to southern China, and southern Vietnam. Its natural habitats are subtropical or tropical moist lowland forests and subtropical or tropical moist montane forests. It used to be considered a subspecies of the chestnut-fronted shrike-babbler.
