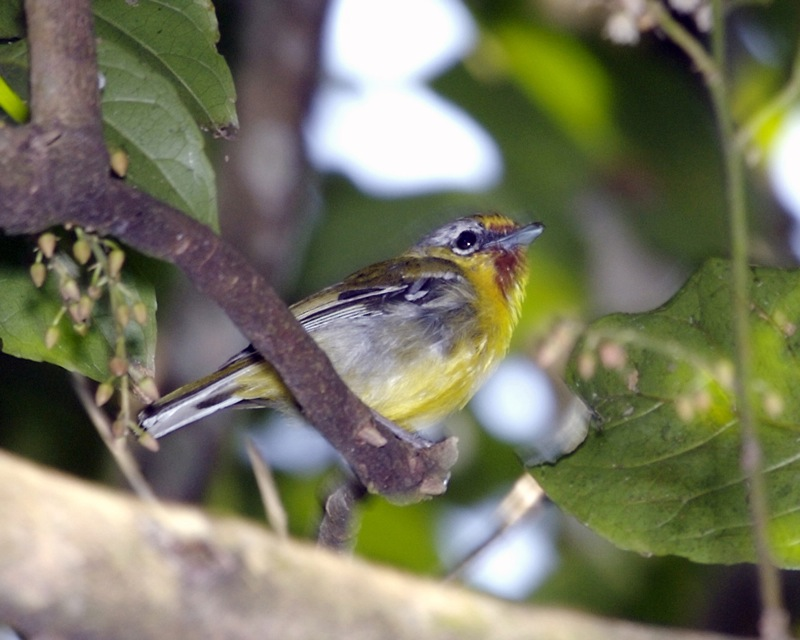
- Male, Java

Conservation status
- Least Concern (IUCN 3.1)

Scientific classification
- Kingdom: Animalia
- Phylum: Chordata
- Class: Aves
- Order: Passeriformes
- Family: Vireonidae
- Genus: Pteruthius
- Species: P. aenobarbus

Binomial name
- Pteruthius aenobarbus (Temminck, 1836)

= Trilling shrike-babbler =

Species of bird

The trilling shrike-babbler (Pteruthius aenobarbus) is a species of bird in the family Vireonidae. It is endemic to the island of Java. Its natural habitats are subtropical or tropical moist lowland forests and subtropical or tropical moist montane forests. It used to be considered the nominate subspecies of the chestnut-fronted shrike-babbler.
