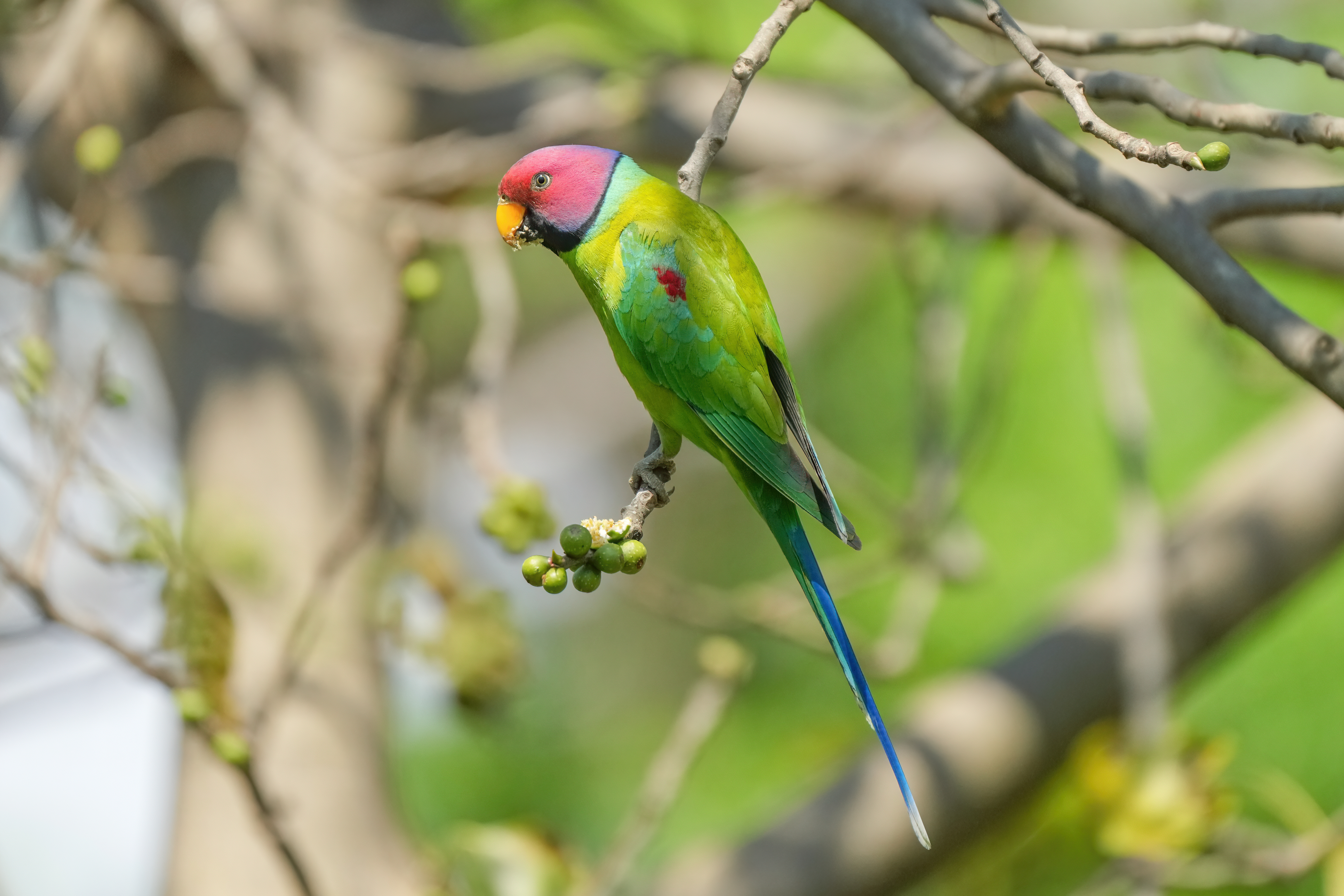
- Male
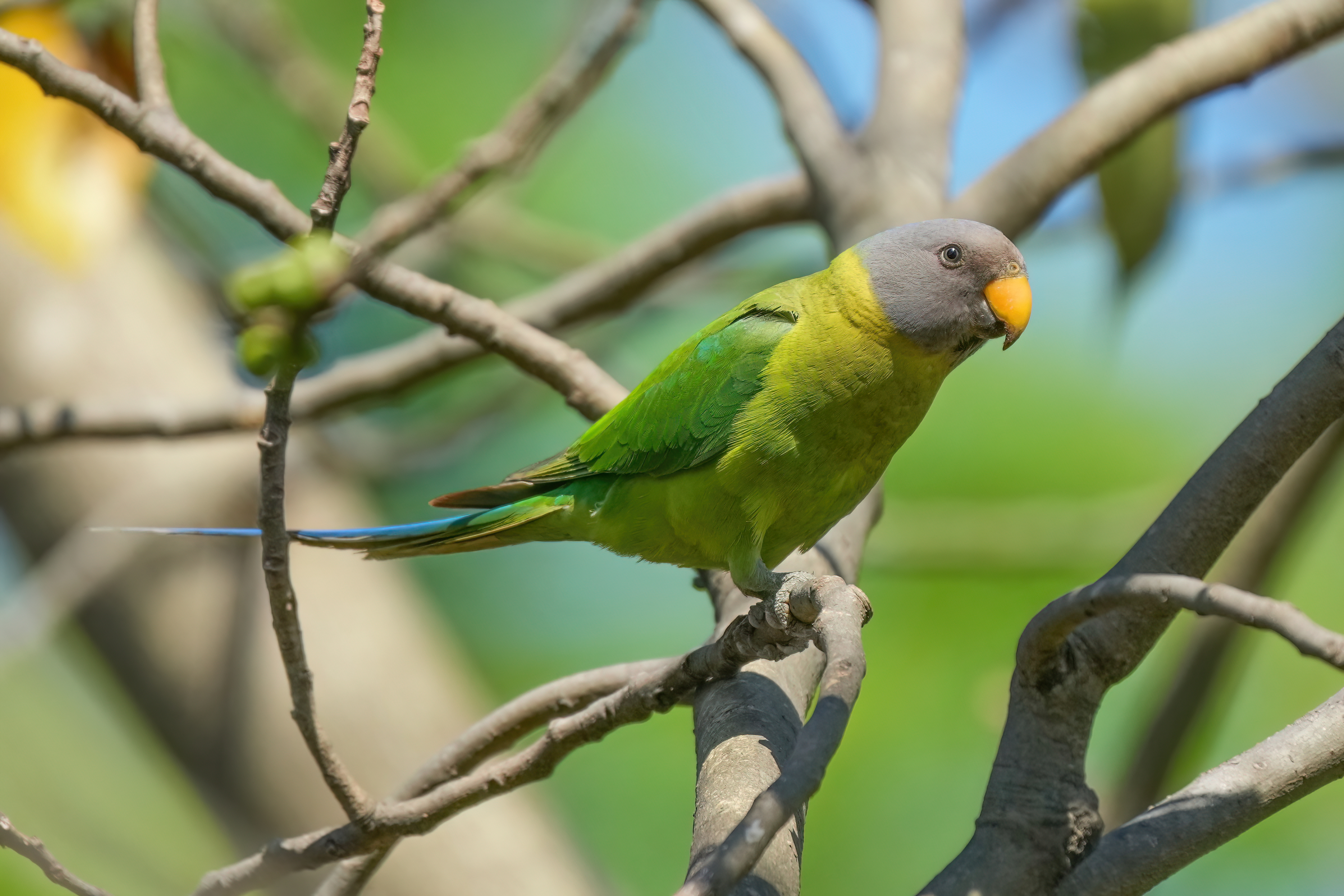
- Female

Conservation status
- Least Concern (IUCN 3.1)
- CITES Appendix II

Scientific classification
- Kingdom: Animalia
- Phylum: Chordata
- Class: Aves
- Order: Psittaciformes
- Family: Psittaculidae
- Genus: Psittacula
- Species: P. cyanocephala

Binomial name
- Psittacula cyanocephala (Linnaeus, 1766)
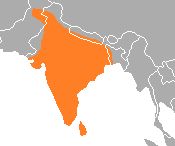
- native range of P. cyanocephala

Synonyms
- Psittacus cyanocephalus Linnaeus, 1766; Himalayapsitta cyanocephala

= Plum-headed parakeet =

Species of bird

The plum-headed parakeet (Psittacula cyanocephala) is a species of parakeet in the family Psittacidae. It is endemic to the Indian subcontinent and was once thought to be conspecific with the blossom-headed parakeet (P. roseata) before being elevated to a full species. Plum-headed parakeets are found in flocks, the males having a pinkish purple head and the females, a grey head. They fly swiftly with twists and turns accompanied by their distinctive calls.

== Taxonomy ==
In 1760 the French zoologist Mathurin Jacques Brisson included a description of the plum-headed parakeet in his Ornithologie based on a specimen collected in India. He used the French name Le perruche a teste bleu and the Latin name Psittaca cyanocephalos. Although Brisson coined Latin names, these do not conform to the binomial system and are not recognised by the International Commission on Zoological Nomenclature. When in 1766 the Swedish naturalist Carl Linnaeus updated his Systema Naturae for the twelfth edition he added 240 species that had been previously described by Brisson. One of these was the plum-headed parakeet. Linnaeus included a terse description, coined the binomial name Psittacus cyanocephalus and cited Brisson's work. The specific name cyanocephalus/cyanocephala combines the Ancient Greek words kuanos "dark-blue" and -kephalos "-headed". This species is now placed in the genus Psittacula which was introduced by the French naturalist Georges Cuvier in 1800.

== Description ==
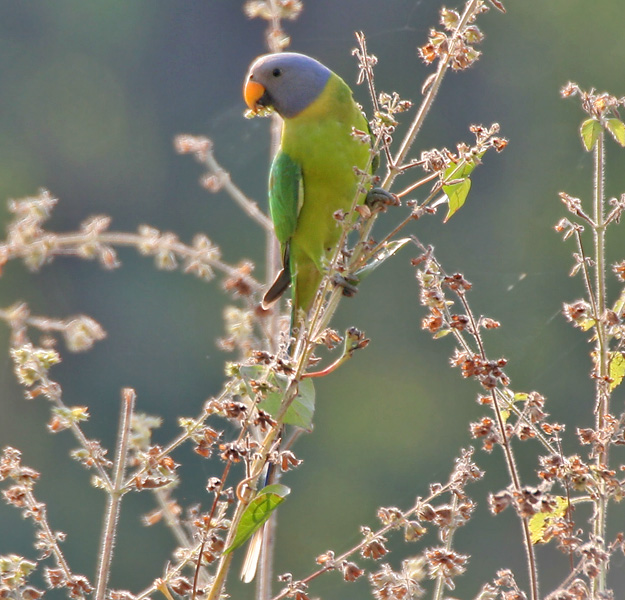
Female foraging

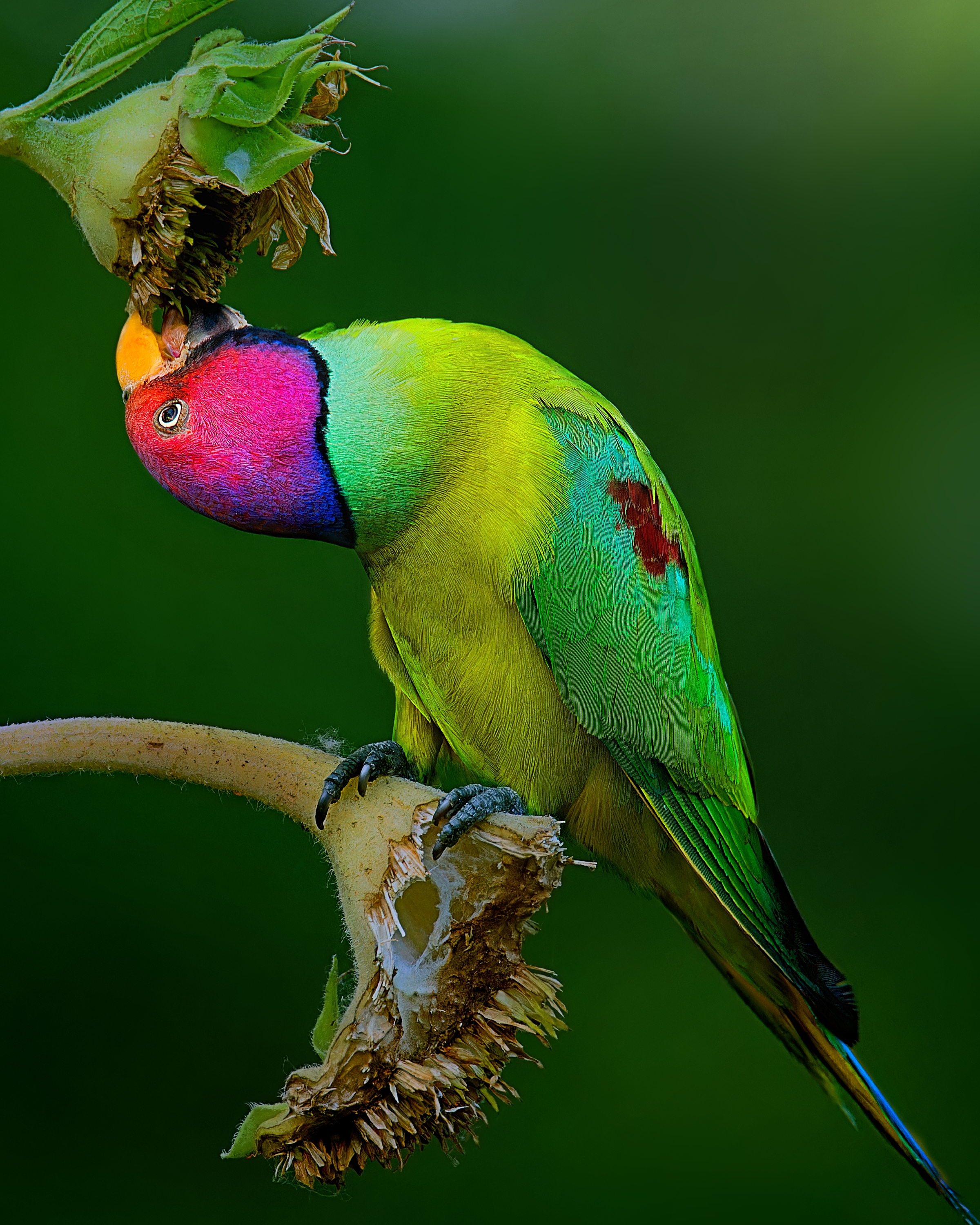
Male

The plum-headed parakeet is a mainly green parrot, 33–37 cm (13–15 in) long with a weight of 55–85 g (1.9–3.0 oz). Its tail has a length of up to 22 cm (8.7 in). The male has a red head which shades to purple-blue on the back of the crown, nape and cheeks, while the female has a blueish-gray head. There is a narrow black neck collar with verdigris below on the nape and a black chin stripe that extends from the lower mandible. There is a red shoulder patch and the rump and tail are bluish-green, the latter tipped white. The upper mandible is orangish-yellow, and the lower mandible is dark. The female has a dull bluish grey head and lacks the black and verdigris collar, which is replaced by yellow. The upper-mandible is corn-yellow and there is no black chin stripe or red shoulder patch. Immature birds have a green head and both mandibles are yellowish. The dark head is acquired after a year. The delicate bluish red appearance resembling the bloom of a peach is produced by a combination of blue from the optical effects produced by the rami of the feather and a red pigment in the barbules.

Some authors have considered the species to have two subspecies, the nominate from peninsular India (type locality restricted to Gingee) and the population from the foothills of the Himalayas as bengalensis on the basis of the colour of the head in the male which is more red and less blue. Newer works consider the species to be monotypic.

The different head colour and the white tip to the tail distinguish this species from the similar blossom-headed parakeet (P. roseata). The shoulder patch is maroon coloured and the shorter tail is tipped yellow in P. roseata.

A supposed species of parakeet, the so-called intermediate parakeet Psittacula intermedia is thought to be a hybrid of this and the slaty-headed parakeet (P. himalayana).

== Habitat and distribution ==
The plum-headed parakeet is a bird of forest and open woodland, even in city gardens. They are found from the foothills of the Himalayas south to Sri Lanka. They are not found in the dry regions of western India. They are sometimes kept as pets and escaped birds have been noted in New York, Florida and in some places in the Middle East.

== Behaviour and ecology ==
Calls

The plum-headed parakeet is a gregarious and noisy species with a range of raucous calls. The usual flight and contact call is tuink? repeated now and then. The flight is swift, and the bird often twists and turns rapidly. It makes local movements, driven mainly by the availability of the fruit and blossoms which make up its diet. They feed on grains, fruits, the fleshy petals of flowers (Salmalia, Butea) and sometimes raid agricultural fields and orchards. The breeding season in India is mainly from December to April, and July to August in Sri Lanka. Courtship includes bill rubbing and courtship feeding. It nests in holes, chiselled out by the pair, in tree trunks, and lays 4–6 white eggs. The female appears to be solely responsible for incubation and feeding. They roost communally. In captivity, it can learn to mimic beeps and short whistling tunes, and can talk very well.

Neoaulobia psittaculae, a quill mite, has been described from the species. A species of Haemoproteus, H. handai, has been described from blood samples from the plum-headed parakeet.

== History ==
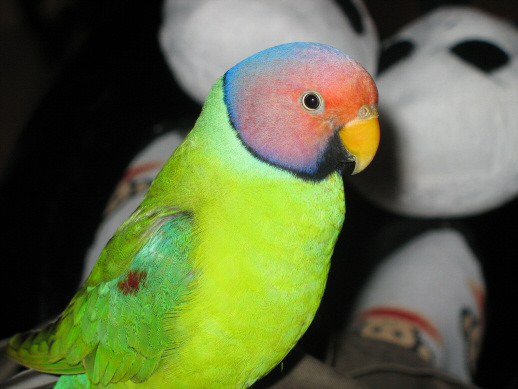
Pet parakeet

Ctesias of Cnidus, a 5th-century BC Greek physician to the emperor Artaxerxes II, who ruled the Achaemenid Empire, accompanied Artaxerxes on his 401 BC campaign against his brother Cyrus the Younger. He was author of the lost Indica, a description of India which he wrote based on his experience in Persia and information he gathered from Persian accounts. Fragments of the Indica were preserved by Photius of Constantinople in his Bibliotheca in the 9th century AD; one of these has been identified as describing Psittacula cyanocephala and its abilities as a talking bird. It is likely Ctesias saw the bird himself, with an Indian handler; though his description could also apply to Psittacula roseata, that species is native to areas far further east and is a much less likely candidate in Greater Iran. In his summary of Ctesias, Photius wrote:

καὶ περὶ τοῦ ὀρνέου τοῦ βυττάκου, ὅτι γλῶσσαν ἀνθρωπίνην ἔχει καὶ φωνήν, μέγεθος μὲν ὅσον ἱέραξ, πορφύρεον δὲ πρόσωπον, καὶ πώγωνα φέρει μέλανα. Αὐτὸ δὲ κυάνεόν ἐστιν ὡς τὸν τράχηλον ὥσπερ κιννάβαρι. Διαλέγεσθαι δὲ αὐτὸ ὥσπερ ἄνθρωπον ἰνδιστί, ἂν δὲ ἑλληνιστὶ μάθῃ, καὶ ἑλληνιστί.

Translation:

[Ctesias says] there is a bird called the bittakos which has a human voice, is capable of speech, and grows to the size of a falcon. It has a crimson face and a black beard and is dark blue as far as the neck ... like cinnabar. It can converse like a human in Indian but if taught Greek, it can also speak Greek.
