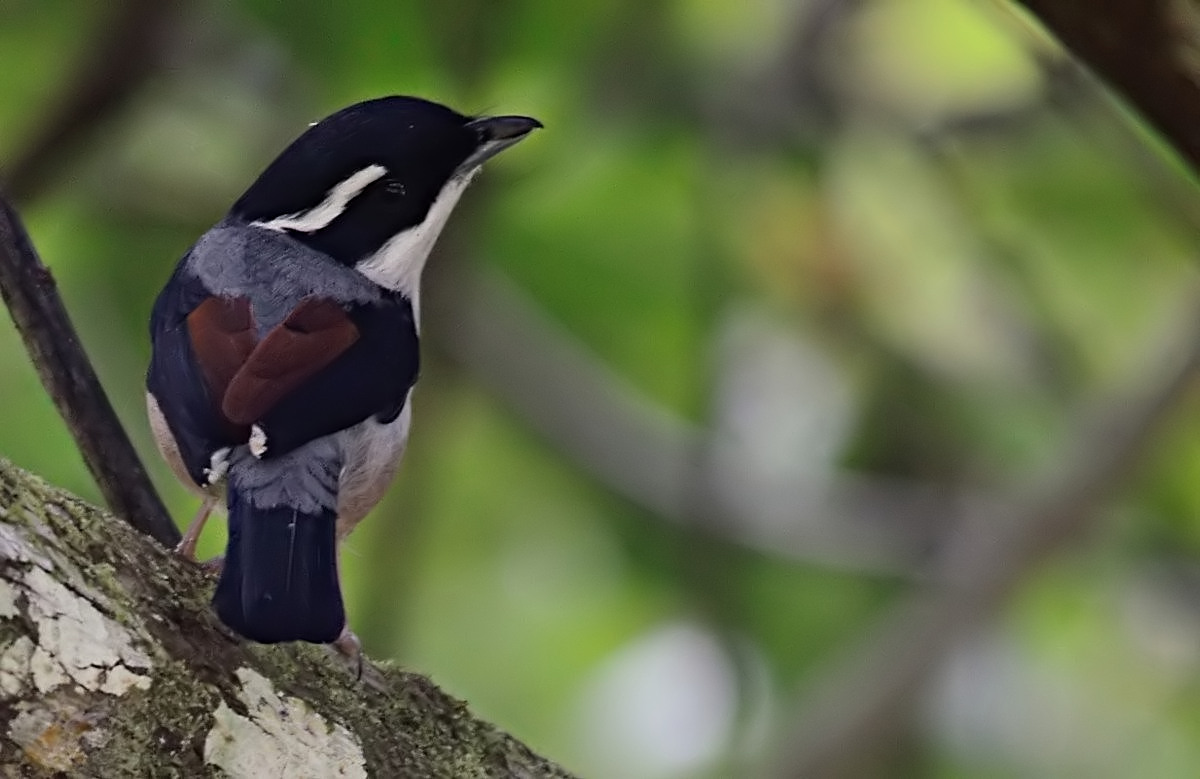
- Blyth's shrike-babbler (Pteruthius aeralatus)

Scientific classification
- Kingdom: Animalia
- Phylum: Chordata
- Class: Aves
- Order: Passeriformes
- Family: Vireonidae
- Genus: Pteruthius; Swainson, 1832

Type species
- Lanius erythropterus "Gould"=Lanius erythropterus Vigors, 1831=Pteruthius validirostris ripleyi Biswas, 1960

= Shrike-babblers =

Genus of birds

The shrike-babblers are a group of small birds in the genus Pteruthius. They are native to the Indomalayan realm, and were traditionally placed in the family Timaliidae before molecular phylogenetic studies in 2007 found that they were best considered as belonging to the family Vireonidae which was then thought to be restricted to the New World. They were traditionally classified into five species with several subspecies but changes in the status of these species on the basis of the phylogenetic species concept suggest more forms in a cryptic species complex. Most species are found in montane forests, with some species descending down to lower altitudes during the winter.

The shrike-babblers range in size from 11.5–20 cm in length and weigh 10-48 g. They are divergent in plumage and size but all possess a stout black hooked bill, short rictal bristles and a distinctive juvenile plumage. They all exhibit sexual dimorphism in plumage, with the males generally brighter. The song is simple and monotonous.

None of the species are considered threatened by human activities.

== Taxonomy ==
The genus Pteruthius was introduced in 1832 by the English zoologist William Swainson with Lanius erythropterus Gould as the type species. The authority was incorrect as the species had been first described by the Irish zoologist Nicholas Vigors in 1831. In 1960 the Indian ornithologist Biswamoy Biswas pointed out that Vigor's name had been used for a different species in 1809 by English naturalist George Shaw. Biswas designated the replacement type as Pteruthius validirostris ripleyi Biswas, 1960. This taxon is now treated as a subspecies of the white-browed shrike-babbler Pteruthius aeralatus ripleyi. The genus name Pteruthius combines the Ancient Greek πτερον/pteron meaning "wing" with ερυθαινω/eruthainō meaning "to dye red".

The emended spelling of Ptererythrius suggested by Strickland was used by some works but dropped as unjustified in later works.

The genus characteristics include a short bill with the culmen sharply ridged with hooked and notched tip. The nostril openings are oval and covered by some rictal bristles. The first primary is less than half the length of the second. The scales on the front of the tarsus are sometimes fused to form a long scutum.

=== Species ===
Seven species are recognised:

Image	Common name	Scientific name	Distribution
	Green shrike-babbler	Pteruthius xanthochlorus	Bhutan, China, India, Myanmar, Nepal, Pakistan, and Vietnam
	Black-eared shrike-babbler	Pteruthius melanotis	Southeast Asia from the Himalayas to western Malaysia
	Black-headed shrike-babbler	Pteruthius rufiventer	eastern Nepal to northwestern Vietnam
	White-browed shrike-babbler	Pteruthius aeralatus	northern Burma to southern Cambodia
	Pied shrike-babbler	Pteruthius flaviscapis	Java
	Clicking shrike-babbler	Pteruthius intermedius	Assam, India, eastern Myanmar to southern China, and southern Vietnam
	Trilling shrike-babbler	Pteruthius aenobarbus	Java

=== Former species ===
Formerly, some authorities also considered the following species (or subspecies) as species within the genus Pteruthius:

- Robust whistler (as Pteruthius spinicaudus)
