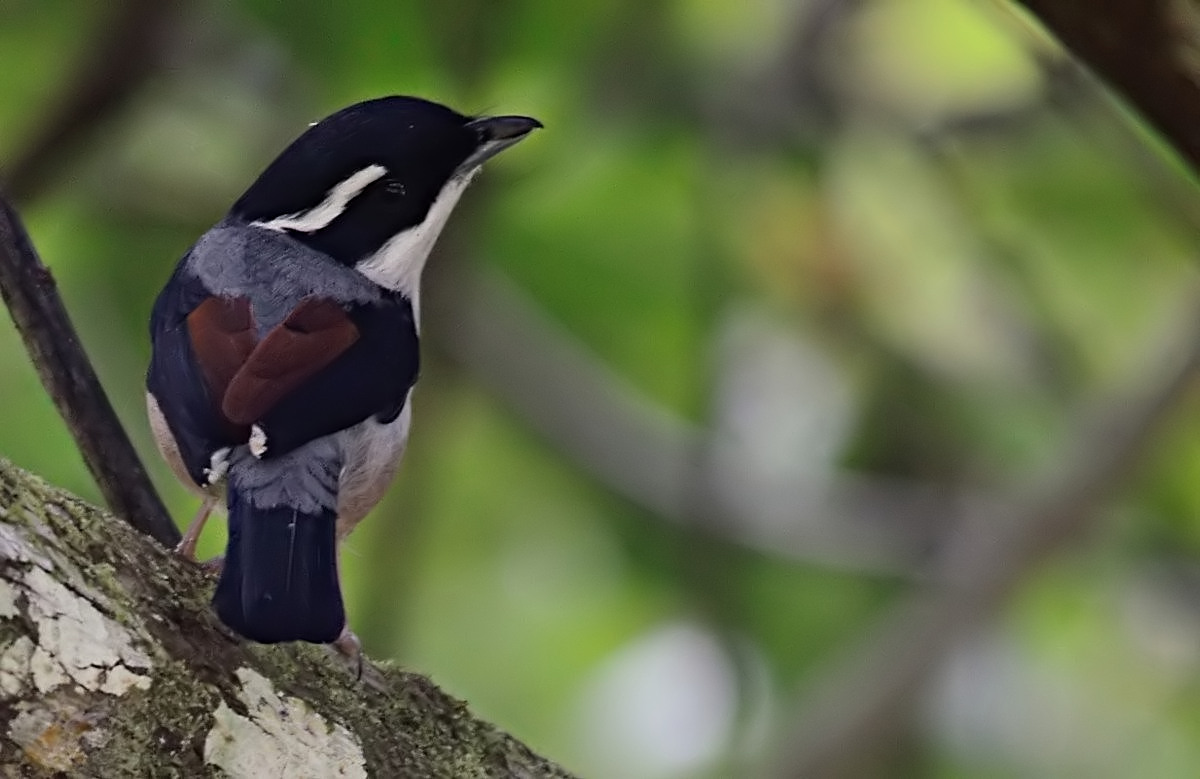
- Male of subspecies validirostris at Namdapha National Park

Conservation status
- Least Concern (IUCN 3.1)

Scientific classification
- Kingdom: Animalia
- Phylum: Chordata
- Class: Aves
- Order: Passeriformes
- Family: Vireonidae
- Genus: Pteruthius
- Species: P. aeralatus

Binomial name
- Pteruthius aeralatus Blyth, 1855
- A rough distribution of the taxa within the species complex

= White-browed shrike-babbler =

Species of bird

The white-browed shrike-babbler (Pteruthius aeralatus) is a bird species found in the eastern Himalayas and Southeast Asia from northern Burma to southern Cambodia. Like others in the genus it is found in montane forests. Males and females have different plumages and variations occur through its range with several populations being treated as subspecies. It is part of a cryptic species complex and was earlier lumped as a subspecies of the white-browed shrike-babbler. Clements lumps this bird into the white-browed shrike-babbler.

== Description ==
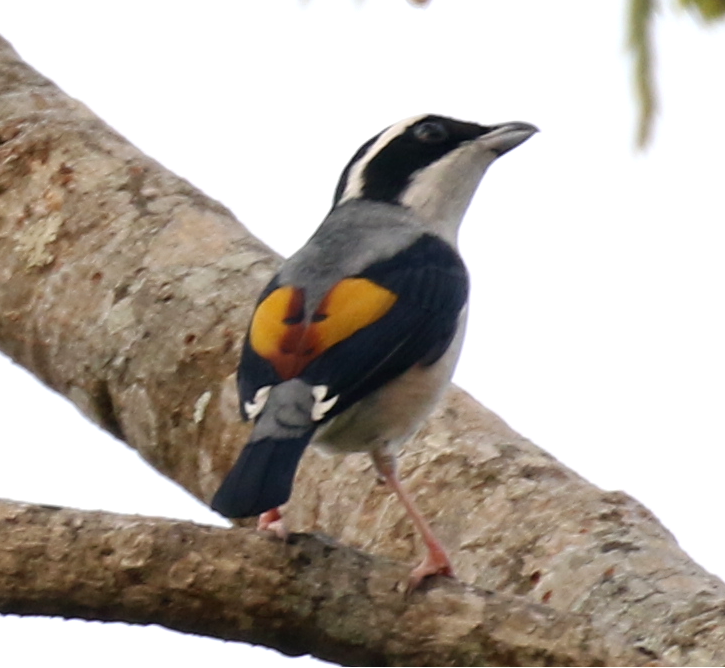
Doi Ang Khang Mountain – Thailand

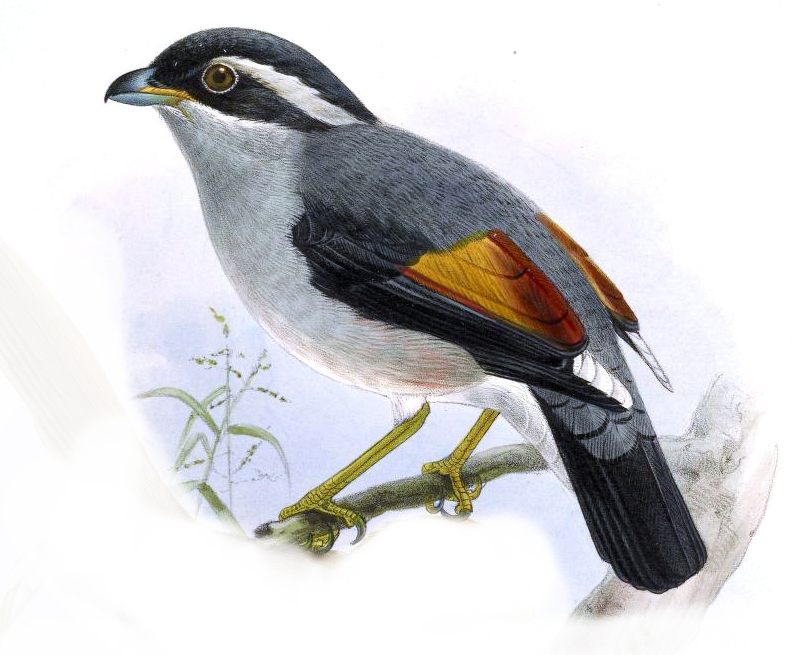
Illustration of a male P. a. aeralatus

The white-browed shrike-babbler is sexually dimorphic. There are many variations between the populations and some are more distinctive than others but they may not be easy to diagnose in the field. In general appearance it is very similar to the Himalayan shrike-babbler but all subspecies with the exception of validirostris have the tertials of males partly coloured rufous and partly fulvous.

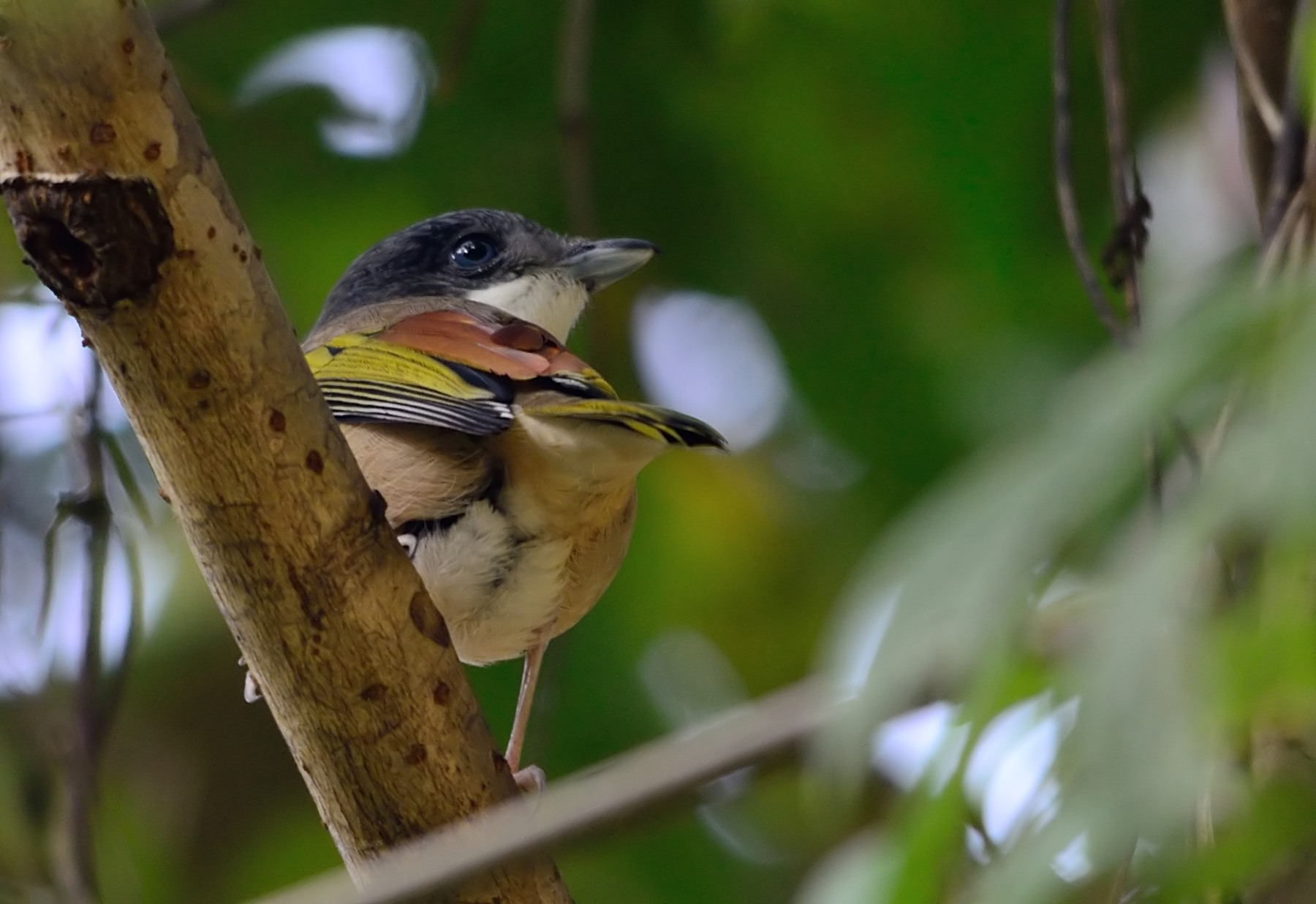
Female of subspecies validirostris at Namdapha National Park

The common name commemorates Edward Blyth (1810–1873), who published the description and notes based on Samuel Tickell's specimen. It was earlier called Tickell's shrike-Tit.

== Taxonomy ==
The species Pteruthius aeralatus was described by Edward Blyth who credited the name to collector Captain Samuel Tickell. This and several other species were later lumped together as subspecies of Pteruthius flaviscapis. In 2008, a molecular phylogenetic study resulted in splitting the flaviscapis group into nine species by application of the phylogenetic species concept and these were subsequently reorganized into four species using the biological species concept, with three of these being lumped into the species currently recognised as the white-browed shrike-babbler.

- The nominate form P. a. aeralatus described by Blyth in 1855 occurs in Burma and western Thailand.
- P. a. validirostris described by Koelz, 1951 is found from parts of eastern Nepal to western Burma. This includes the forms nocrecus and glauconotus which were also described by Koelz (who was known for being a "splitter").
- P. a. ricketti described by Ogilvie-Grant in 1904 is found from northeastern Burma to southeast China and parts of Indochina.
- P. a. schauenseei described by Deignan in 1946 is found in southern Thailand
- P. a. cameranoi described by Salvadori in 1879 is found in the Malay Peninsula and on the island of Sumatra.
- P. a. robinsoni described by Chasen & Kloss in 1931 is found in Borneo.
- P. a. ripleyi described by Biswas in 1960 is found in the western Himalayas east to central Nepal.
- P. a. annamensis described by Robinson & Kloss in 1919 is found in southern Vietnam.
