= Biswamoy Biswas =

Indian ornithologist (1923–1994)

- Biswas examining the Pangboche scalp, purported to be from a Yeti, during the Daily Mail Snowman Expedition of 1954
- Born: 2 June 1923; Calcutta, India
- Died: 10 August 1994 (aged 71); Calcutta, India
- Education: University of Calcutta (MSc 1945, Ph.D. 1952), British Museum, Berlin Zoological Museum, American Museum of Natural History
- Known for: Work on the birds of Nepal and Bhutan
- Scientific career
- Institutions: Zoological Survey of India, Calcutta (Joint director)
- Patrons: Sunderlal Hora
- Author abbrev. (zoology): Biswas

Biswamoy Biswas (2 June 1923 – 10 August 1994) was an Indian ornithologist who was born in Calcutta, the son of a professor of geology. In 1947, he was awarded a three-year fellowship by Sunderlal Hora, then director of the Zoological Survey of India (ZSI). It enabled him to study at the British Museum, at the Berlin Zoological Museum under Erwin Stresemann and also at the American Museum of Natural History under Ernst Mayr.

Biswas studied biology in his college instead of geology as his father wished. He graduated from the University of Calcutta in 1943 and received an MSc in 1945. He received a Ph.D. in 1952 from the University of Calcutta working under J.L. Bhaduri. He was part of the Daily Mail expedition sent to look for the Yeti around Mount Everest in 1954. He was elected Corresponding Fellow of The American Ornithologists' Union in 1963. He later took charge of the Bird and Mammal Section of the Zoological Survey of India. He won Chapman Grants from the American Ornithologists' Union in 1965, 1966 and 1970, for research at the British Museum. Later, he was joint director of the ZSI, until he retired in 1981, and then emeritus scientist until 1986.

Some of his landmark works were on the birds of Nepal and Bhutan. In the list of birds of the world published by AviList in 2025, Biswas is the cited authority for four bird subspecies and for the blossom-headed parakeet (Psittacula roseata).

A flying squirrel species Biswamoyopterus biswasi is named in his honour.

== Publications ==
- Biswas, B. (1947): Notes on a collection of birds from the Darrang District, Assam. Records of the Indian Museum 45: 225–244.
- Biswas, B. (1947): On a collection of birds from Rajputana. Records of the Indian Museum 45: 245–265.
- Biswas, B. (1950): On the taxonomy of some Asiatic Pygmy Woodpeckers. Proceedings of the Zoological Society of Bengal 3(1): 1-37.
- Biswas, B. (1950): The Himalayan races of the Nutcracker Nucifraga caryocatactes (Linne.) [Aves]. Journal of the Zoological Society of India 2(1): 26.
- Biswas, B. (1950): The generic limits of Treron Vieillot. Bulletin of the British Ornithologists Club 70(5): 34.
- Biswas, B. (1951): Revisions of Indian birds. American Museum Novitates 1500: 1–12.
- Biswas, B. (1951): Notes on the taxonomic status of the Indian Plaintive Cuckoo Cuculus passerinus Vahl. Ibis 93(4): 596–598.
- Biswas, B. (1951): On some Larger Spine-tailed Swifts, with the description of a new subspecies (Chaetura cochinensis rupchandi) from Nepal. Ardea 39(4): 318–321.
- Biswas, B. (1952): Geographical variation in the woodpecker Picus flavinucha Gould. Ibis 94(2): 210–219.
- Biswas, B. (1953): Fauna of the Balangir District (formerly Patna State), Orissa. II. Birds. Records of the Indian Museum 51: 416–419.
- Biswas, B. (1954): Fauna of the Balangir District (formerly Patna State) Orissa. Birds. Records of the Indian Museum 51: 416–419.
- Biswas, B. (1954): A checklist of genera of Indian birds. Additions and corrections. Records of the Indian Museum 54: 101-106a.
- Biswas, B. (1954): Review: The Birds of Travancore & Cochin. By Salim Ali, with 22 plates (16 in colour by D.V. Cowen). Pp. xx+668. (Oxford University Press) Bombay, 1953. Journal of the Bombay Natural History Society 52(2&3): 573–575.
- Biswas, B. (1955): Review: The Book of Indian Birds. By Salim Ali. 5th (Revised) edition. Pp. xlvi + 142, (7 1/4" × 4 3/4") 78 plates (56 in colour by D.V. Cowen), 3 diagrams and 2 end paper maps. Bombay Natural History Society, Bombay, 1955. Journal of the Bombay Natural History Society 53(1): 117–118.
- Biswas, B. (1955): Zoological results of the Daily Mail Himalayas Expedition 1954. Two new birds from Khumba, Eastern Nepal. Bulletin of the British Ornithologists Club 75(7): 87–88.
- Biswas, B. (1958): Taxonomic status of the Blood Pheasants of Nepal and Sikkim. Journal of the Zoological Society of India 10(1): 100–101.
- Biswas, B. (1959): A note on the correct zoological name of the Indian Little Green Heron (Aves, Ardeidae). Current Science 28: 288.
- Biswas, B. (1960): A new name for the Himalayan Red-winged Babbler, Pteruthius. Bulletin of the British Ornithological Union 80(6): 106.
- Biswas, B. (1961): Proposal to designate a neotype for Corvus benghalensis Linnaeus, 1758 (Aves), under the plenary powers Z.N. (S) 1465. Bulletin of Zoological Nomenclature 18(3): 217–219.
- Biswas, B. (1962): The birds of Nepal. Part 8. Journal of the Bombay Natural History Society 59(3): 807–821.
- Biswas, B. (1962): Further notes on the Shrikes Lanius tephronotus and Lanius schach. Ibis 104(1): 112–115.
- Biswas, B. (1962): Review: A Synopsis of the Birds of India and Pakistan. By Sidney Dillon Ripley II. pp. xxxvi+703 (23×15.5 cm.). Bombay, 1961. Bombay Natural History Society. Journal of the Bombay Natural History Society 59(1): 276–278.
- Biswas, B. (1973): Report of the Indian national section. Bulletin of the International Council for Bird Preservation 11: 238–239.
- Biswas, B. (1983): Additional notes on birds recorded on 1954 'Daily Mail' Himalayan Expedition. Unpublished.
- Biswas, B. (?): Comments on Ripley's A Synopsis of the Birds of India and Pakistan. Part 2. Unpublished manuscript.
- Biswas, Biswamoy (1950): On the Shrike Lanius tephronotus (Vigors), with remarks on the erythronotus and tricolor groups of Lanius schach Linne, and their hybrids. Journal of the Bombay Natural History Society 49(3): 444–455.
- Biswas, Biswamoy (1951): A new race of the Ground-Thrush Turdus citrinus (Aves: Turdidae). Journal of the Bombay Natural History Society 49(4): 661–662.
- Biswas, Biswamoy (1952): A checklist of genera of Indian birds. Records of the Indian Museum 50(1): 1-62.
- Biswas, Biswamoy (1956): A Large Indian Kite Milvus migrans lineatus (Gray) with a split bill. Journal of the Bombay Natural History Society 53(3): 474–475.
- Biswas, Biswamoy (1959): On the validity of Harpactes erythrocephalus hodgsoni (Gould) [Aves: Trogonidae]. Journal of the Bombay Natural History Society 56(2): 335–338.
- Biswas, Biswamoy (1959): On the Parakeet, Psittacula intermedia (Rothschild) [Aves: Psittacidae]. Journal of the Bombay Natural History Society 56(3): 558–562.
- Biswas, Biswamoy (1960): The birds of Nepal. Journal of the Bombay Natural History Society 57(2): 278–308.
- Biswas, Biswamoy (1960): The birds of Nepal. Part 2. Journal of the Bombay Natural History Society 57(3): 516–546.
- Biswas, Biswamoy (1961): The birds of Nepal. Part 3. Journal of the Bombay Natural History Society 58(1): 100–134.
- Biswas, Biswamoy (1961): The birds of Nepal. Part 4. Journal of the Bombay Natural History Society 58(2): 441–474.
- Biswas, Biswamoy (1961): The birds of Nepal. Part 5. Journal of the Bombay Natural History Society 58(3): 653–677.
- Biswas, Biswamoy (1962): The birds of Nepal. Part 6. Journal of the Bombay Natural History Society 59(1): 200–227.
- Biswas, Biswamoy (1962): The birds of Nepal. Part 7. Journal of the Bombay Natural History Society 59(2): 405–429.
- Biswas, Biswamoy (1963): The birds of Nepal. Part 9. Journal of the Bombay Natural History Society 60(1): 173–200.
- Biswas, Biswamoy (1963): The birds of Nepal. Part 10. Journal of the Bombay Natural History Society 60(2): 388–399.
- Biswas, Biswamoy (1963): The birds of Nepal. Part 11. Journal of the Bombay Natural History Society 60(3): 638–654.
- Biswas, Biswamoy (1963): Review: Comments on Ripley's "A Synopsis of the Birds of India and Pakistan". Journal of the Bombay Natural History Society 60(3): 679–689.
- Biswas, Biswamoy (1966): The birds of Nepal. Part 12. Journal of the Bombay Natural History Society 63(2): 365–377.
- Biswas, Biswamoy (1968): The female of Molesworth's Tragopan Tragopan blythi molesworthi (Baker). Journal of the Bombay Natural History Society 65(1): 216–217.
- Biswas, Biswamoy (1968): Some new bird records for Nepal. Journal of the Bombay Natural History Society 65(3): 782–784.
- Biswas, Biswamoy (1969): Review: Handbook of the Birds of India and Pakistan, Vol. 1. By Salim Ali and S. Dillon Ripley. pp. lviii+380 (16.7 × 24.7 cm.). 18 coloured plates. Bombay, 1968. Oxford University Press. Price Rs. 90. Journal of the Bombay Natural History Society 66(1): 152–154.
- Biswas, Biswamoy (1969): Review: Birds of Kerala (second edition of The Birds of Travancore and Cochin). By Salim Ali. pp. xxiii+444 (16.5 × 24 cm.) + 22 plates (16 in colour by D.V. Cowen) + many pen-and-ink sketches+end-paper maps. Bombay, 1969. Oxford University Press. Journal of the Bombay Natural History Society 66(2): 372–373.
- Biswas, Biswamoy (1972): Review: Handbook of the Birds of India and Pakistan. Vol. 6. By Salim Ali and S. Dillon Ripley. pp. xvi+245 (24×16 cm) with 8 coloured plates and numerous black-and-white illustrations. Bombay, 1971. Oxford University Press. Journal of the Bombay Natural History Society 69(2): 400–401.
- Biswas, Biswamoy (1974): Zoological results of the Daily Mail Himalayan Expedition 1954: Notes on some birds of Eastern Nepal. Journal of the Bombay Natural History Society 71(3): 456–495.
- Biswas, Biswamoy (1978): Review: Field Guide to the Birds of the Eastern Himalayas. By Salim Ali. pp. xvi+263 (11.8×18 cm). With 37 coloured plates. Delhi, 1977. Oxford University Press. Journal of the Bombay Natural History Society 75(3): 915–916.
- Biswas, Biswamoy (1985): Review: Comments on Ripley's "A Synopsis of the Birds of India and Pakistan" - Second Edition (1982). Journal of the Bombay Natural History Society 82(1): 126–129.
- Biswas, Biswamoy (1986): Review: A Pictorial Guide to the Birds of the Indian Subcontinent. By Salim Ali & S. Dillon Ripley. Pp. 117+106 plates (73 in colour, 33 monochrome), (18.5 cm × 24.7 cm) with plates by John Henry Dick. New Delhi, 1983. Bombay Natural History Society & Oxford University Press. Journal of the Bombay Natural History Society 83(2): 412–414.
- Biswas, Biswamoy (1989): Taxonomic status of Psittacula intermedia (Rothschild). Journal of the Bombay Natural History Society 86(3): 448.
