= Beni greenlet =

Scientific classification
- Kingdom: Animalia
- Phylum: Chordata
- Class: Aves
- Order: Passeriformes
- Family: Vireonidae
- Genus: Hylophilus
- Species: H. moxensis

Binomial name
- Hylophilus moxensis van Els, Montenegro-Avila, Avalos, T. Wijpkema & J.T. Wijpkema, 2026

Species of bird

The Beni greenlet (Hylophilus moxensis) is a species of bird in the family Vireonidae, the vireos, greenlets, and shrike-babblers. It is endemic to Bolivia.

== Etymology ==
The specific epithet is derived from the region it inhabits, Llanos de Moxos.

== Distribution and habitat ==
The Beni greenlet is endemic to Bolivia, specifically in Beni Department. It is found in scrub near marshy areas and is always found in the vicinity of water. It prefers living in short-stature trees such as species in the Mimosaceae family and deciduous trees. The species has also been found in Guadua, but does not seem to depend on the genus as its main habitat. The species may also live in northern La Paz, north-eastern Cochabamba, and north-western Santa Cruz. It may also be found in Peru and Brazil but these are both unconfirmed.

== Description ==
The Beni greenlet looks very similar in size and shape to the grey-eyed greenlet, especially in the northern populations of that species. However, there are several visible differences.

The species always has dark brown eyes, while the grey-eyed greenlet often has pale greyish eyes. The ear area (the feathers on the side of the head) is plain light grey and lacks the darker streaks commonly seen in the grey-eyed greenlet. Darker grey coloring in the Beni greenlet is usually limited to a small spot just behind the eye, which sometimes extends into a short line, and to a black area at the base of the lower bill.

Many individuals also show dark grey coloring between the eye and the bill, along with faint stripes along the cheek and near the mouth. Like the grey-eyed greenlet, the Beni greenlet often has a light buff (yellow-brown) tint across the underside of the body, not just near the tail.

While the grey-eyed greenlet often has a clearly defined reddish-brown patch on the ear area, the Beni greenlet usually shows only a very faint buff tint there, extending from the back of the neck or from the underparts.

H. moxensis can be told apart from the rufous-crowned greenlet by the lack of a large grey patch on the forehead and by the absence of a distinct black patch on the ear area, even though some individuals share grey coloring between the eye and bill with that species.
