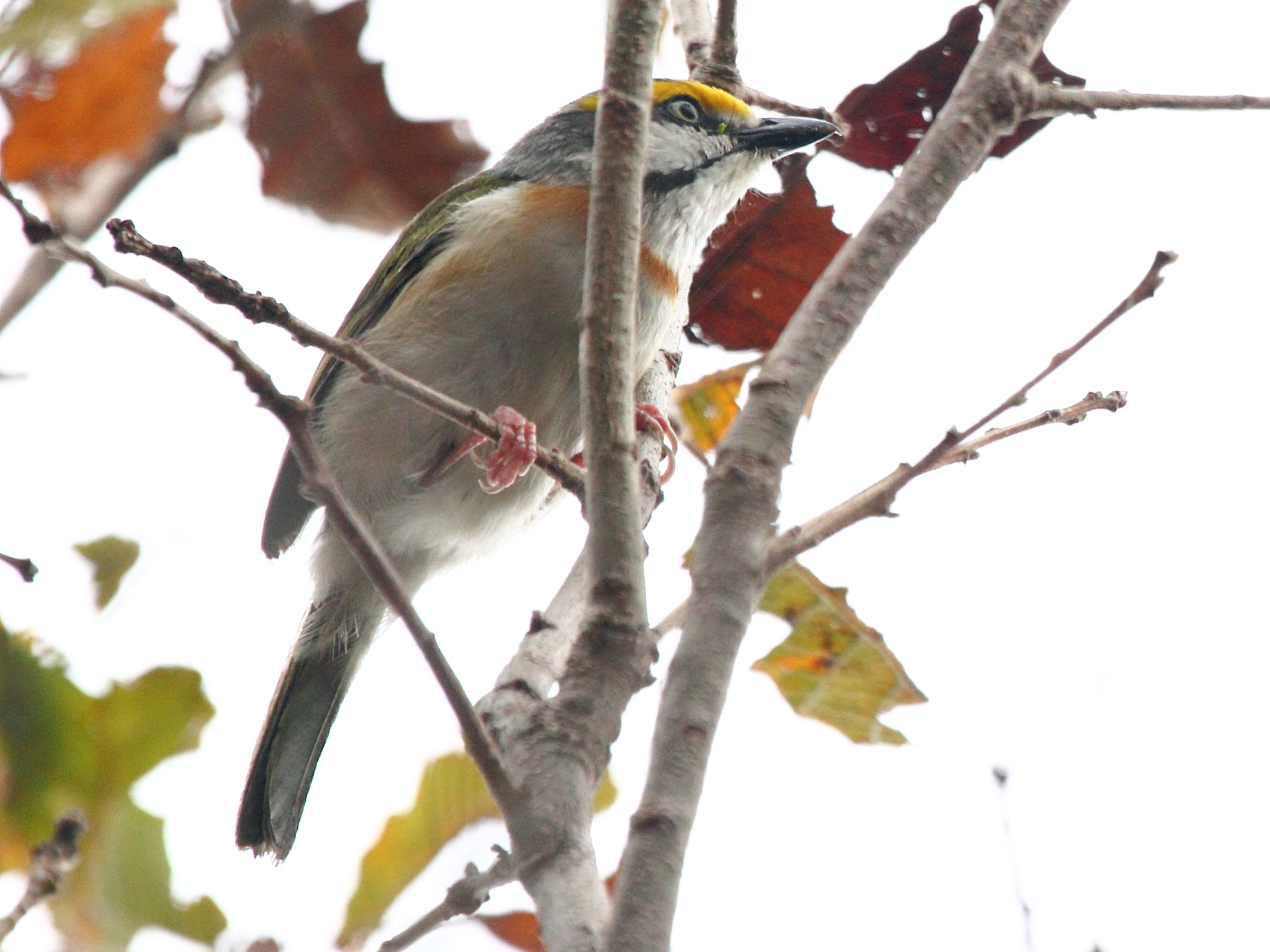

Conservation status
- Least Concern (IUCN 3.1)

Scientific classification
- Kingdom: Animalia
- Phylum: Chordata
- Class: Aves
- Order: Passeriformes
- Family: Vireonidae
- Genus: Vireolanius
- Species: V. melitophrys

Binomial name
- Vireolanius melitophrys Bonaparte, 1850

= Chestnut-sided shrike-vireo =

Species of bird

The chestnut-sided shrike-vireo (Vireolanius melitophrys), sometimes called the honey-browed shrike-vireo, is a species of bird in the family Vireonidae, and probably the largest member of the entire family. A widespread species of subtropical and tropical moist montane forests, this species is found from Jalisco and San Luis Potosí, Mexico in the north to southern Guatemala.

== Taxonomy and systematics ==
One of four species within the genus Vireolanius. The exact relationships of Vireolanius to other members of Vireonidae are not fully resolved, but it appears to be one of the basal groups within the New World Vireonidae along with Cyclarhis possibly Hylophilus. Within the genus Vireolanius, the chestnut-sided shrike-vireo appears to be the outgroup with respect to all other shrike-vireos.

Two or three subspecies are recognized, depending on the taxonomic list being used. The type specimen of V. m. goldmani is alleged to be an immature of V. m. melitophrys, in which case it should be considered a junior synonym of V. m. melitophrys.

Vireolanius melitophrys subspecies
Subspecies	Authority	Distribution	List Source
V. m. melitophrys	Bonaparte, 1850	Central Mexico (type locality inferred to be Jico near Xalapa, Veracruz)	IOC / Clements
V. m. crossini	Phillips, AR, 1991	Southwest Mexico	IOC
V. m. quercinus	Griscom, 1935	Southern Mexico and Guatemala	IOC
V. m. goldmani	Nelson, 1903	South-central Mexico (type locality is Huitzilac, Morelos)	Clements

== Description ==
=== Size ===
One of the largest species in Vireonidae, with a length of 16.5 to 18 cm (6.5 to 7.1 in) and a mean body mass of 34.7 g (1.22 oz). Sexes are of similar sizes. Only one other population of Vireonid reaches this size - the Cozumel rufous-browed peppershrike Cyclarhis gujanensis insularis.

=== Plumage ===
A striking bird, adult chestnut-sided shrike-vireos have bright green backs and largely white undersides punctuated by their eponymous chestnut flanks that meet in a chest band. The head is characterized by a slate crown and nape, golden-yellow eyebrows that sometimes reach the lores at the bill base, black eyelines that are thin near the bill and thickest where they meet the gray nape, white cheeks, thin black malars, and a white throat. The legs are pink, and irides are yellow. Chestnut-sided shrike vireos are sexually dimorphic, unlike most species of Vireonid which are monomorphic (with the exception of the black-capped vireo Vireo atricapillus). Females can be separated from the males by their paler plumage and reduced chestnut coloration.

=== Vocalizations ===
The song is a complex, multi-pitched single-syllable whistle that quickly ascends in pitch with multiple harmonics before a longer, less harmonized descent, often given in repeated succession with pauses between whistles generally lasting between 0.7–1 seconds. Calls consist of a hoarse chatter, similar to many other species of Vireonid. A relatively difficult to observe species, vocalizations have proven to be one of the best ways to detect chestnut-sided shrike-vireos, with songs audible up to 400 metres (1,300 ft) away.

Six primary vocalizations have been described by Barlow & James:

Vireolanius melitophrys vocalizations
Category	Description	Example
Primary Song	Complex, mostly descending whistle given only by males. Whistles are given in repeated succession.	Song in response to playback, Jalisco
Short Song	Short (0.2 sec), nonmusical descending call given singly, possibly serving as a signal from the male to the female around nests.	
Myaaaah Call	Vocalization similar to the harmonics at the beginning of song whistles, described from a female responding to playback.	Call presumably from female, Oaxaca
Distress (Agitated) Call	Agitated, harsh calls, often given when being handled.	Agitated calls in response to playback, Jalisco
Contact Call	Low pitched buzzy notes given singly by either sex.	Presumed contact calls, Morelos
Buzz-rattle	Like a long contact call given by either sex. Often given by birds approaching the nest alone.	

== Distribution and habitat ==
A humid pine-oak specialist, this species is restricted to montane habitats from central Mexico (Jalisco and San Luis Potosí) to southern Guatemala. It is nowhere common, having one of the lowest relative abundances of any medium-sized songbird in Oaxacan pine-oak forests. In all regions, it is confined to tropical and subtropical forests zones, mostly above 1,800 metres (5,900 ft). In San Luis Potosí, this species is found principally between 4,000 feet (1,200 m) to 6,700 feet (2,000 m) in elevation. Similarly, a study in Jalisco only recorded this species above 1,400 metres (4,600 ft), with most birds found between 1,800 metres (5,900 ft) and the highest elevations of the study area, 2,000 metres (6,600 ft).

== Behavior and Ecology ==
=== Territoriality ===
Chestnut-sided shrike-vireos will maintain territories of up to 4 acres (1.6 ha) or more. Males will often countersing, and will even engage in physical combat, latching on to each other while calling and beating each other with their wings. When agitated, birds will often raise their crown feathers and occasionally even fan their tails.

=== Vocal Behavior ===
Male chestnut-sided shrike-vireos sing the most during the nest-building phase of the breeding cycle in May, and show reduced vocal activity during the non-breeding season. Song bouts are usually approximately a minute in length, delivered with the body held between 50 and 80 degrees above the horizontal and the bill held perpendicular to the body, and delivered with as few as ten minutes between song bouts in the breeding season. Birds will respond to playback, and give a variety of contact, distress, and territorial calls depending on the situation (see Vocalizations above).

=== Food and Feeding ===
Forages for arthropods (including caterpillars, wasps, grasshoppers, bugs, spiders, and beetles) primarily in the leaves and epiphytic vegetation in the inner foliage of trees. Large arthropods, over approximately 70 millimetres (2.8 in), will be beaten to death in the branches and sometimes held in the feet and dissected with the bill. Birds will less commonly eat vegetation and engage in frugivory. These birds prefer to stay in the mid-height of the tree but sometimes moving almost to the ground and up into the higher portions of the vegetation. Forage alone or in pairs, these birds are most active in the morning and late afternoon, often methodically moving from perch to perch approximately 1 metre (3.3 ft) at a time. Occasionally joins mixed-species flocks.

=== Nesting ===
Both sexes create cup nests in trees usually about 7.5 metres (25 ft) above the ground using vegetation such as grasses.

=== Threats ===
Vulnerable to habitat fragmentation, with a study from Oaxaca indicating a minimum habitat size of 30,000 hectares (74,000 acres) for the species to occur.

== Status ==
This conservations status of this species is presently considered Least Concern, with a stable population estimated between 20,000-50,000 birds and a global distribution less than 500,000 square kilometres (190,000 sq mi).
