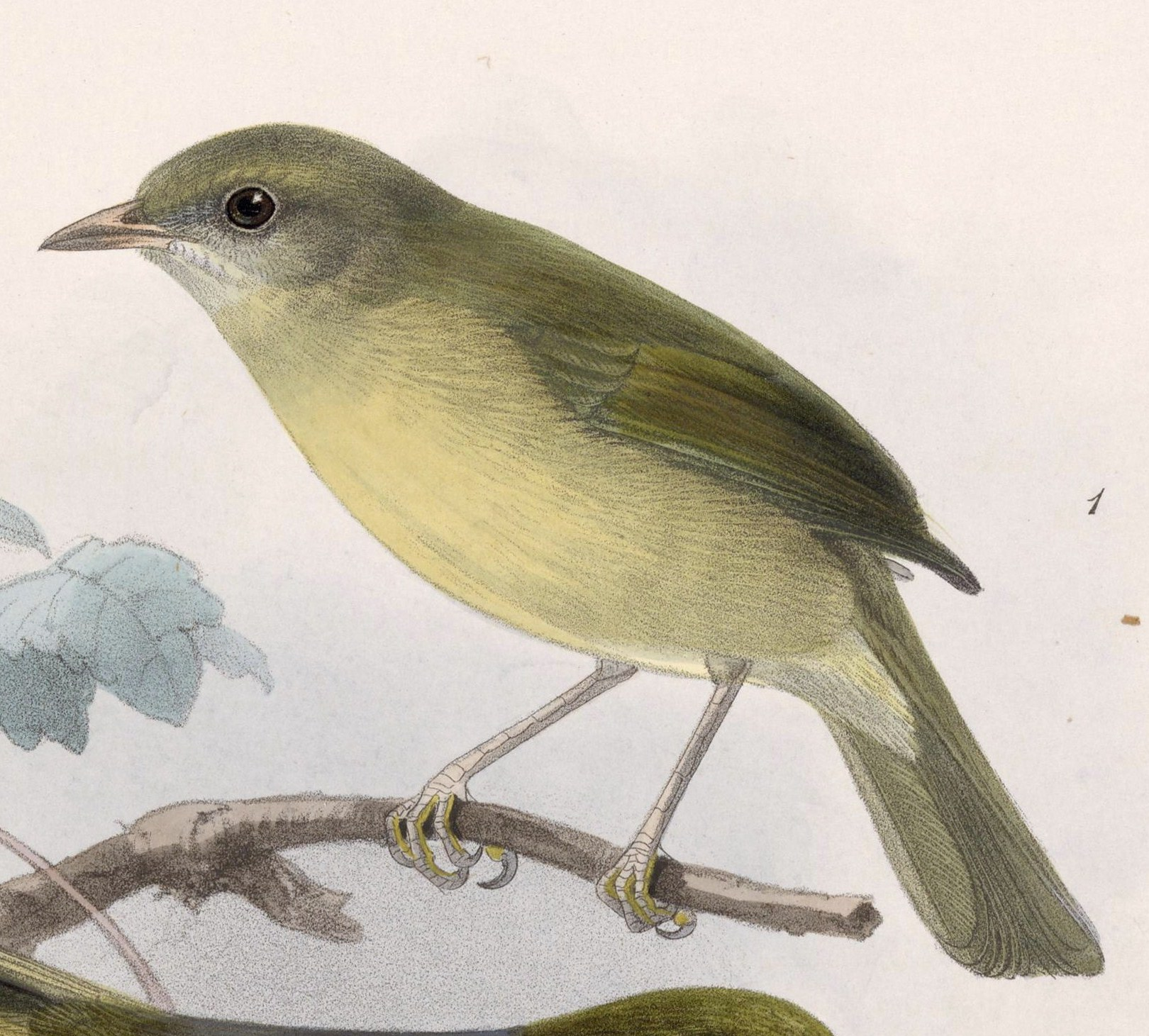

Conservation status
- Least Concern (IUCN 3.1)

Scientific classification
- Kingdom: Animalia
- Phylum: Chordata
- Class: Aves
- Order: Passeriformes
- Family: Vireonidae
- Genus: Hylophilus
- Species: H. flavipes

Binomial name
- Hylophilus flavipes Lafresnaye, 1845

= Scrub greenlet =

Species of bird

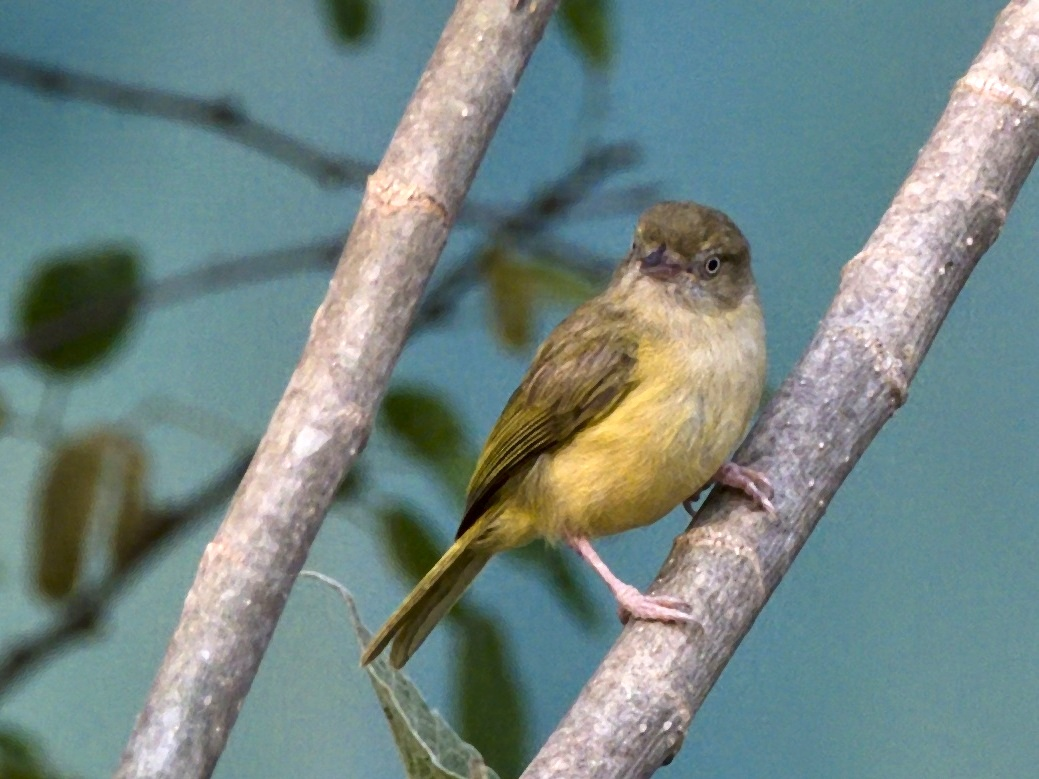
Scrub greenlet H. f. flavipes

The scrub greenlet (Hylophilus flavipes) is a small passerine bird in the family Vireonidae, the vireos, greenlets, and shrike-babblers. It is found in Colombia, Costa Rica, Panama, Tobago, and Venezuela.

== Taxonomy and systematics ==
The scrub greenlet's taxonomy is unsettled. The IOC, the Clements taxonomy, AviList, and the independent South American Classification Committee assign it these seven subspecies:

- H. f. viridiflavus Lawrence, 1861
- H. f. xuthus Wetmore, 1957
- H. f. flavipes Lafresnaye, 1845
- H. f. melleus Wetmore, 1941
- H. f. galbanus Wetmore & Phelps, WH Jr, 1956
- H. f. acuticaudus Lawrence, 1865
- H. f. insularis Sclater, PL, 1861

However, BirdLife International's Handbook of the Birds of the World (HBW) treats H. f. viridiflavus and H. f. xuthus as the "yellow-green greenlet" and H. f. insularis as the "Tobago greenlet". It retains the English name "scrub greenlet" for H. flavipes and the other three subspecies. Clements does recognize these taxa as distinctive within the full species, calling them the "scrub greenlet (yellow-green)", "scrub greenlet (Tobago)" and "scrub greenlet (scrub)". The North American Classification Committee of the American Ornithological Society similarly groups the subspecies with the larger species.

In the mid-twentieth century at least one author considered the olivaceous greenlet (H. olivaceous) to be another subspecies of the scrub greenlet. However, later work showed they are not closely related but that the scrub and grey-chested (H. semicinereus) greenlets are sister species.

This article follows the one-species, seven-subspecies model.

== Description ==
The scrub greenlet is 10.5 to 12.5 cm (4.1 to 4.9 in) long and weighs 9.5 to 14 g (0.34 to 0.49 oz). The sexes have the same plumage. Adults of the nominate subspecies H. f. flavipes have a dull olive-green crown, nape, and upperparts with a slightly lighter rump. The sides of their head are pale gray. Their wings' flight feathers are mostly blackish gray with thin greenish edges on the outer webs of the primaries and secondaries and wider greenish yellow edges on the tertials. Their tail is greenish gray. Their chin, throat, and breast are whitish gray and their belly pale yellowish. They have a whitish or gray iris, a grayish or grayish pink maxilla, a more pink mandible, and bluish or dusky pink legs and feet. Juveniles have essentially the same plumage but a dark bill and iris.

The other subspecies of the scrub greenlet differ from the nominate and each other thus:

- H. f. viridiflavus: yellowish olive crown, nape, upperparts, and tail; wings' coverts and secondaries yellowish olive and primaries blackish with yellowish olive edges on outer webs; chin dull white, throat and upper breast pale yellowish olive, the rest of underparts pale yellow; yellowish white to gray iris, brown maxilla, paler mandible, pale brown to yellowish brown legs and feet
- H. f. xuthus: similar to viridiflavus with darker green upperparts, buffier underparts, darker flanks, and yellowish white iris
- H. f. melleus: darker crown and back and buffier underparts than nominate with a darker upper breast than lower breast; olive brown bill with olive-buff base on mandible and olive-brown legs and feet
- H. f. galbanus: buffier breast and flanks and whiter abdomen than nominate; white iris
- H. f. acuticaudus: duller overall than nominate with dull citrine upperparts and deep olive-buff underparts; dark iris
- H. f. insularis: grayer head than nominate with deep grayish olive upperparts and deep olive-buff underparts; dark brown iris, black maxilla and grayish pink mandible, and pinkish gray legs and feet

== Distribution and habitat ==
The subspecies of the scrub greenlet are found thus:

- H. f. viridiflavus: from southern end of the Gulf of Nicoya in Costa Rica south on the Pacific slope into Panama to Panamá Province and Caribbean slope in Panama around the Canal Zone
- H. f. xuthus: Coiba Island off southwestern Panama
- H. f. flavipes: northern Colombia on Caribbean east to Santa Marta and south in the valley of the Magdalena River
- H. f. melleus: Colombia's Serranía de Macuira in extreme eastern La Guajira Department
- H. f. galbanus: northern Colombia from Santa Marta area east (except tip of Guajira Peninsula) into northwestern Venezuela to Barinas and Portuguesa states and south in Colombia's Eastern Andes to northwestern Meta Department
- H. f. acuticaudus: northern Venezuela from eastern Zulia east to Sucre and south to Apure, northern Amazonas, and northeastern Bolívar; Margarita Island
- H. f. insularis: Tobago

The scrub greenlet in inhabits somewhat different tropical zone landscapes across its range. The two Central American subspecies are found primarily in low dense scrub and also in oil palm plantations, mature secondary forest, in bamboo stands, and in pastures and clearings that have trees. In elevation it reaches 900 m (3,000 ft) in Costa Rica and is mostly below 450 m (1,500 ft) in Panama. The three mainland South American species also are found in arid scrublands, especially those regenerating with trees, and also dry to moist semi-deciduous and deciduous forest and woodlands, and gallery forest. In elevation they reach 1,000 m (3,300 ft) in Colombia, 1,200 m (3,900 ft) north of the Orinoco River in Venezuela, and 500 m (1,600 ft) south of it. Subspecies H. f. insularis on Tobago prefers taller scrub and the edges of forest, and is found mostly below 500 m (1,600 ft).

== Behavior ==
=== Movement ===
The scrub greenlet is apparently a sedentary year-round resident.

=== Feeding ===
The scrub greenlet's diet has not been detailed, but is known to be mostly arthropods, and also includes berries and seeds. The bird typically forages in pairs and sometimes in apparent family groups, and sometimes joins mixed-species feeding flocks. It takes prey by gleaning from foliage, both alive and dead, and often hangs upside-down while doing so. At least in South America, it typically feeds between about 2 and 8 m (5 and 25 ft) above the ground.

=== Breeding ===
The scrub greenlet's nesting season has not been defined but appears to span from April to July in Costa Rica. It apparently has a prolonged season in Colombia and Venezuela, with nest construction, eggs, recently fledged juveniles, and other indicators of breeding from March at least to late fall. On Tobago its season is thought to be July to October but may begin as early as February. Nests in Costa Rica were cups made from fine plant fibers with moss on the outside placed in branch forks between about 4 and 10 m (15 and 35 ft) above the ground. Nests on Tobago were cups made from leaves, stems, and grass lined with fine grasses. They were also in branch forks and about 2 and 10 m (5 and 35 ft) above the ground. The clutch size in both countries was two to three; the eggs are white with brown spots. In both countries the incubation period, time to fledging, and details of parental care are not known.

=== Vocalization ===
The scrub greenlet's song varies among the subspecies. In Costa Rica it sings "a sweet and simple we-cher, we-cher, we-cher, we-cher, we-cher, we-cher, wee". In Venezuela it sings "a penetrating series, turee, turee, turee...of 4-20 or more notes" and makes a nasal scold "nyaa-nyaa-nyaa...". On Tobago its song is "a musical series of 10–20 even-pitched notes, tree, tree, tree, tree..." and its call is "a harsh, nasal zeer, zeer". The species sings mostly in the morning.

== Status ==
The IUCN follows HBW taxonomy and so has separately assessed the scrub greenlet sensu stricto, "yellow-green greenlet", and "Tobago greenlet". All three are assessed as being of Least Concern. The first has a large range in South America; its population size is not known and is believed to be stable. The "yellow-green greenlet" has a smaller range in Central America; its population size is not known and is believed to be increasing. The "Tobago greenlet" has a limited range. Its estimated population of between 1500 and 7000 mature individuals is believed to be stable. No immediate threat to any of them has been identified. The scrub greenlet is considered uncommon in Costa Rica, fairly common in Colombia, common in Venezuela, and common on Tobago.
