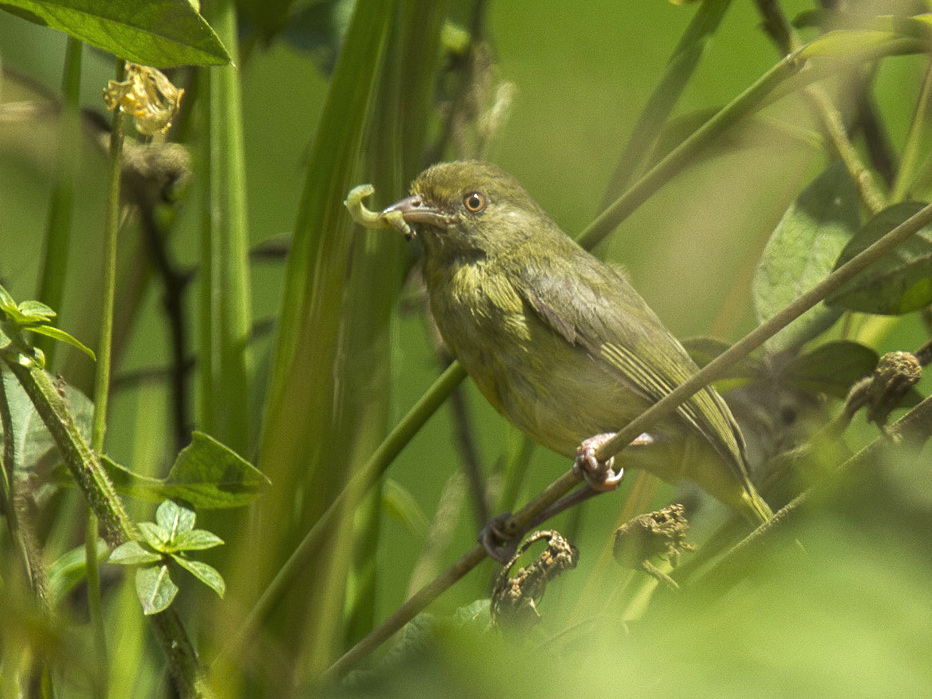

Conservation status
- Least Concern (IUCN 3.1)

Scientific classification
- Kingdom: Animalia
- Phylum: Chordata
- Class: Aves
- Order: Passeriformes
- Family: Vireonidae
- Genus: Hylophilus
- Species: H. olivaceus

Binomial name
- Hylophilus olivaceus Tschudi, 1844

= Olivaceous greenlet =

Species of bird

The olivaceous greenlet (Hylophilus olivaceus) is a species of bird in the family Vireonidae, the vireos, greenlets, and shrike-babblers. It is found in Ecuador and Peru.

== Taxonomy and systematics ==
In the mid-twentieth century at least one author considered the olivaceous greenlet to be a subspecies of the scrub greenlet (Hylophilus flavipes). However, later work showed they are not closely related but that the olivaceous and ashy-headed (H. pectoralis) greenlets are sister species.

The olivaceous greenlet is monotypic.

== Description ==
The olivaceeous greenlet is 12 cm (4.7 in) long and weighs 11 to 13 g (0.39 to 0.46 oz). The sexes have the same plumage. Adults have a yellowish olive forehead. The rest of the top of their head and their upperparts, wings, and tail are dull olive-green. Their underparts are yellowish olive that is slightly lighter on the chin and a slightly brighter yellow on the belly. They have a whitish iris, a dull pink or brownish pink bill, and brownish pink legs and feet.

== Distribution and habitat ==
The olivaceous greenlet has a disjunct distribution on the eastern slope of the Andes. It is found in Ecuador from Napo Province south almost to the Peruvian border. In Peru it is found in southern Amazonas and northern San Martín departments and separately from southern Huánuco to northern Junín departments. The species inhabits the edges and shrubby clearings of forest and mature secondary forest. In elevation it ranges between 600 and 1,450 m (2,000 and 4,800 ft) in Ecuador and between 1,000 and 1,700 m (3,300 and 5,600 ft) though locally down to 750 m (2,500 ft) in Peru.

== Behavior ==
=== Movement ===
The olivaceous greenlet is apparently a sedentary year-round resident.

=== Feeding ===
The olivaceous greenlet's diet is not known. It typically forages singly or in pairs and only occasionally joins mixed-species feeding flocks.

=== Breeding ===
A pair of adult olivaceous greenlets were observed feeding a newly fledged young in June in Peru. Nothing else is known about the species' breeding biology.

=== Vocalization ===
The olivaceous greenlet's song has been described as a "distinctive and loud...series of up to 10-12 musical suwee or peer notes". Another description is "a single note repeated in a series, for example: wee wee wee wee wee wee wee".

== Status ==
The IUCN originally in 1988 assessed the olivaceous greenlet as being of Least Concern, then in 2012 as Near Threatened, and since 2021 again as of Least Concern. It has a large range and its estimated population of at least 50,000 mature individuals is believed to be stable. "The species is threatened by the conversion of its habitat for agricultural purposes, but due to its tolerance of secondary and open growth it is currently not considered at risk." It is considered uncommon to fairly common overall and "fairly common but local" in Peru.
