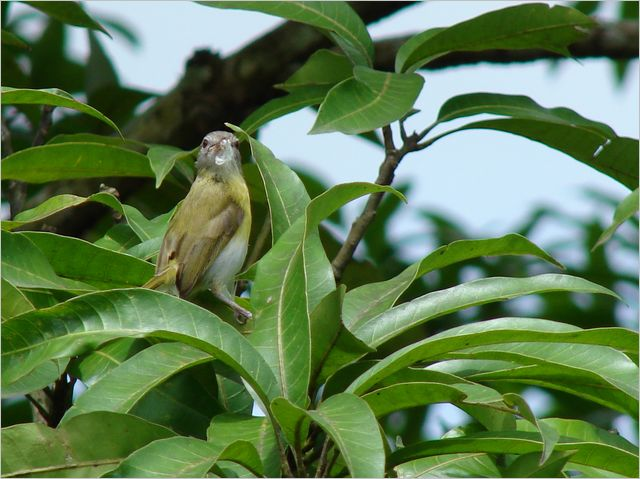
- Adult in Wanica (Suriname) collecting nest building material

Conservation status
- Least Concern (IUCN 3.1)

Scientific classification
- Kingdom: Animalia
- Phylum: Chordata
- Class: Aves
- Order: Passeriformes
- Family: Vireonidae
- Genus: Hylophilus
- Species: H. pectoralis

Binomial name
- Hylophilus pectoralis Sclater, PL, 1866

= Ashy-headed greenlet =

Species of bird

The ashy-headed greenlet (Hylophilus pectoralis) is a species of bird in the family Vireonidae, the vireos, greenlets, and shrike-babblers. It is found in Bolivia, Brazil, French Guiana, Guyana, Peru, Suriname, and Venezuela.

== Taxonomy and systematics ==
The ashy-headed greenlet is monotypic. It and the olivaceous greenlet (H. olivaceus) are sister species.

== Description ==
The ashy-headed greenlet is 12 cm (4.7 in) long and weighs 10.3 to 12.4 g (0.36 to 0.44 oz). The sexes have the same plumage. Adults have a dull gray forehead, crown, and nape. They have a dull grayish white supercilium and grayish ear coverts. Their upperparts are dull greenish. Their wings and tail are dull greenish with brighter greenish edges on the feathers. Their chin is off-white, their throat mottled grayish white, their breast greenish yellow, their flanks grayish, and their belly dull white. They have a brown or orangey-brown iris, a dark brown maxilla, a lighter brown mandible, and pink-brown legs and feet. Juveniles have a more buffy (less gray) crown than adults.

== Distribution and habitat ==
The ashy-headed greenlet has a disjunct distribution. Its main range forms a rough backwards "E" shape that is mostly in the northern and central Amazon Basin. That range begins in extreme northern Brazil and Guyana and extends east across northern Suriname and French Guiana to the Atlantic in northeastern Brazil. From there it extends in Brazil southeast to Maranhão and westward up the lower Amazon River. It continues southwest in Brazil to Mato Grosso do Sul and west to Rondônia and then across northern Bolivia. It is known from a single record in northeastern Venezuela's Delta Amacuro state and separately in the middle valley of the Huallaga River in Peru's Department of San Martín.

The ashy-headed greenlet inhabits deciduous forest and woodlands, riverine forest, plantations, gardens, and the edges of mangrove forest. In elevation it ranges from sea level to 400 m (1,300 ft) in most of its range. It reaches at least 500 m (1,600 ft) in Peru.

== Behavior ==
=== Movement ===
The ashy-headed greenlet is apparently a sedentary year-round resident.

=== Feeding ===
The ashy-headed greenlet's diet is known only from observations in Suriname, where it was primarily insects and some plant matter such as mistletoe (Loranthaceae) berries. There it fed actively at the outer edges of trees and bushes and often joined mixed-species feeding flocks.

=== Breeding ===
The ashy-headed greenlet's breeding season is known only from observations in Suriname, where it extended from January to mid-September. Both sexes built an open cup nest woven between two branches. The one clutch was two eggs that were white with blackish spots; both parents incubated the clutch. The incubation period, time to fledging, and other details of parental care are not known.

=== Vocalization ===
The ashy-headed greenlet's song is a "high, hurried Wéeje-Wéeje-Wéeje-, rapid tutjeweé-tutjeweé-tutjeweé-, [or] loud, sharp WúTjirrrr".

== Status ==
The IUCN has assessed the ashy-headed greenlet as being of Least Concern. It has a very large range; though its population size is not known it is believed to be stable. No immediate threats have been identified. It is considered "common to frequent" in Brazil and "fairly common" in its restricted Peruvian range. It is adaptable and "able to exist in modified habitats".
