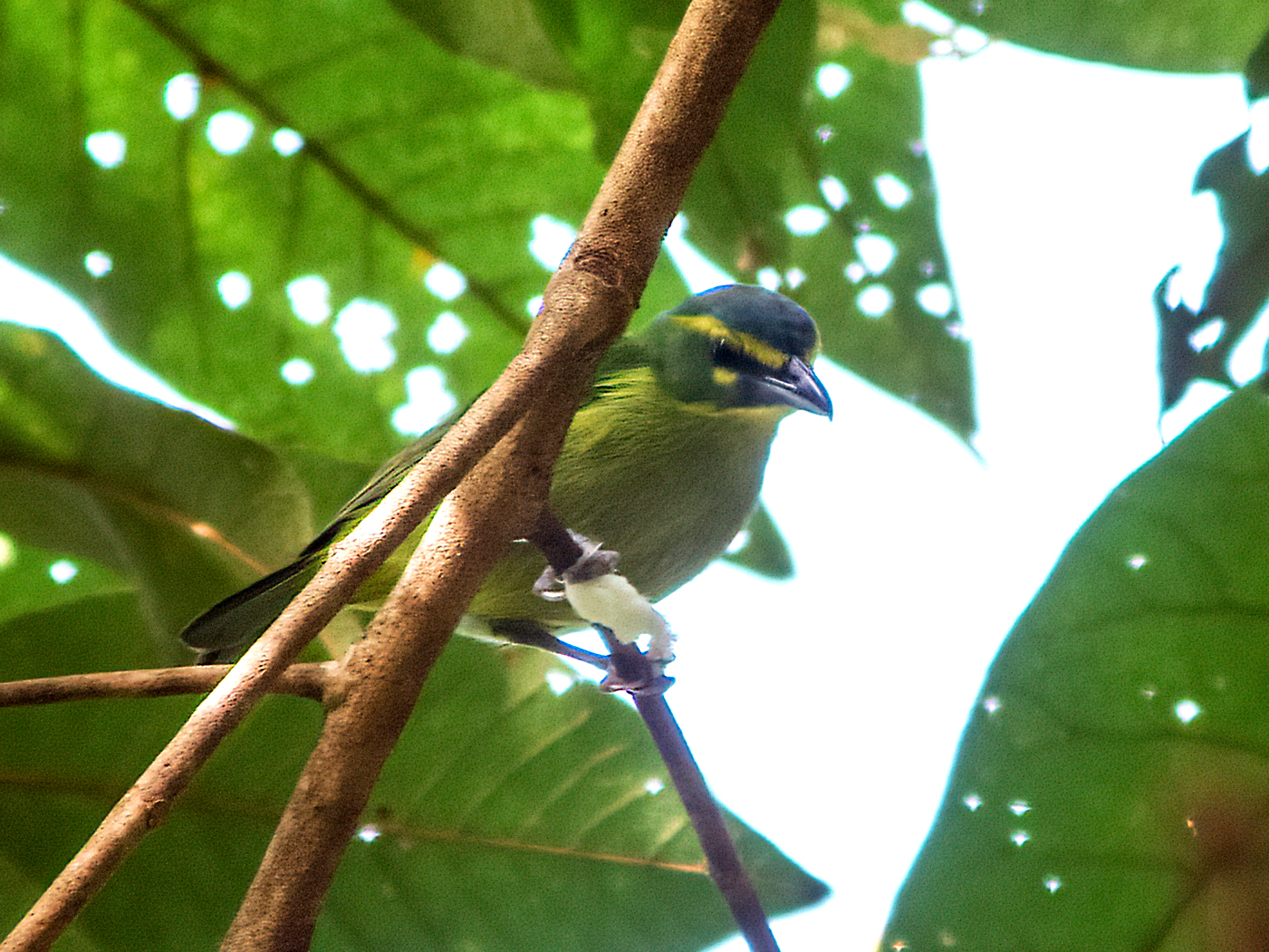

Conservation status
- Least Concern (IUCN 3.1)

Scientific classification
- Kingdom: Animalia
- Phylum: Chordata
- Class: Aves
- Order: Passeriformes
- Family: Vireonidae
- Genus: Vireolanius
- Species: V. eximius

Binomial name
- Vireolanius eximius Baird, 1866

= Yellow-browed shrike-vireo =

Species of bird

The yellow-browed shrike-vireo (Vireolanius eximius) is a species of bird in the family Vireonidae, the vireos, greenlets, and shrike-babblers. It is found in Colombia, Panama, and Venezuela.

== Taxonomy and systematics ==
The yellow-browed shrike-vireo was originally described in 1866 as Vireolanius eximius, its present binomial. However, for a time in the early twentieth century it was placed in genus Smaragdolanius and its own family, Vireolaniidae. By the 1970s Smaragdolanius had been merged into Vireolanius and included in the family Vireonidae.

The yellow-browed shrike-vireo was previously classified as a subspecies of the green shrike-vireo (V. pulchellus) and the two form a superspecies. Its further taxonomy is not settled. The IOC and AviList treat it as a monotypic species. The Clements taxonomy and BirdLife International's Handbook of the Birds of the World assign it two subspecies, the nominate V. e. eximius and V. e. mutabilis.

This article follows the monotypic species model.

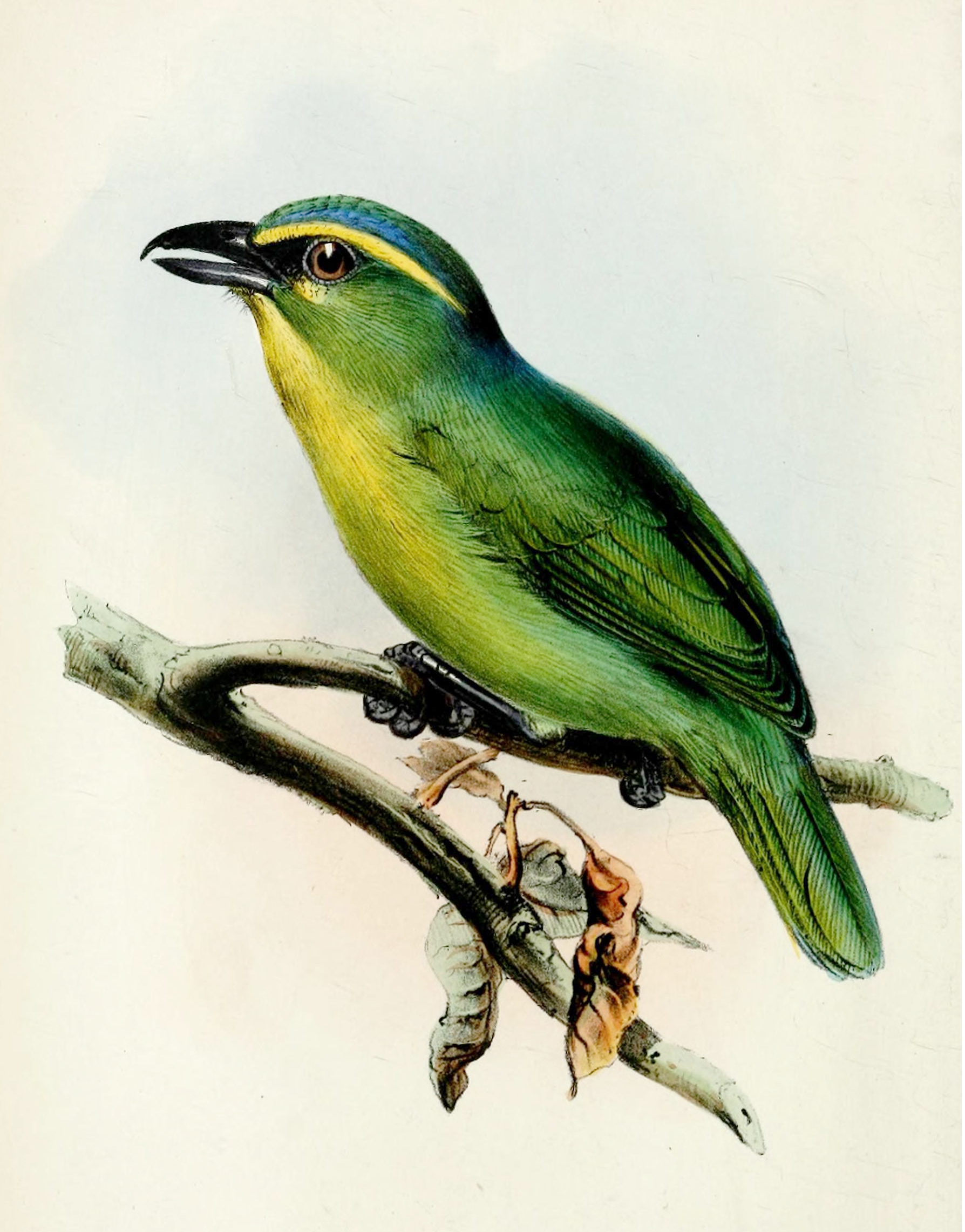
Illustration by Joseph Wolf, 1855

== Description ==
The yellow-browed shrike-vireo is 13 to 14 cm (5.1 to 5.5 in) long. The sexes have the same plumage though that of females is duller than males'. They have a sky-blue forehead, crown, and nape with some greenish in the rear of the crown. They have a bright lemon-yellow supercilium from the bill well past the eye and a patch of the same color under the eye. Their lores are dull gray-black and their ear coverts emerald-green. Their upperparts are emerald-green. Their flight feathers are mostly dark gray with wide emerald-green edges on the outer webs of the primaries and secondaries and lemon-yellow edges on the inner webs of the tertials. Their tail is dull emerald-green. Their chin and throat are lemon-yellow and the rest of their underparts are a more greenish yellow. They have a dark iris, a blackish maxilla, a horn-gray mandible, and dull gray-brown legs and feet.

== Distribution and habitat ==
The yellow-browed shrike-vireo has a disjunct distribution. Its main range extends from Darién Province in eastern Panama into northwestern Colombia as far south as Meta Department and east almost to Venezuela. It is found on both slopes of the Serranía del Perijá on the Colombia/Venezuela border and in the Venezuelan state of Zulia. It inhabits lowland and montane evergreen forest in the tropical and lower subtropical zones. In Panama it is found below 1,000 m (3,300 ft). In Colombia it reaches 1,500 m (4,900 ft). In Venezuela it mostly ranges between 350 and 1,250 m (1,100 and 4,100 ft) but has been recorded once at 1,700 m (5,600 ft).

== Behavior ==
=== Movement ===
The yellow-browed shrike-vireo is a year-round resident.

=== Feeding ===
The yellow-browed shrike-vireo's diet is not known but is assumed to be similar to that of the green shrike-vireo, which see here. It usually forages in the forest canopy and often joins mixed-species feeding flocks.

=== Breeding ===
The yellow-browed shrike-vireo's breeding season has not been defined but includes May and June in Colombia. Nothing else is known about the species' breeding biology.

=== Vocalization ===
The yellow-browed shrike-vireo's song in Panama is described as " a continuously repeated peer-peer-peer" or a "sustained túuu---". In Colombia it is described as "lu lu lu lu".

== Status ==
The IUCN has assessed the yellow-browed shrike-vireo as being of Least Concern. Its population size is not known and is believed to be decreasing. No immediate threats have been identified. It is "[g]enerally rather uncommon in much of [its] range" and "arguably the least common of the four species of Vireolanius". It is considered common in Colombia and poorly known but "[probably] fairly common" in Venezuela. It occurs in one national park in each of Panama and Colombia.
