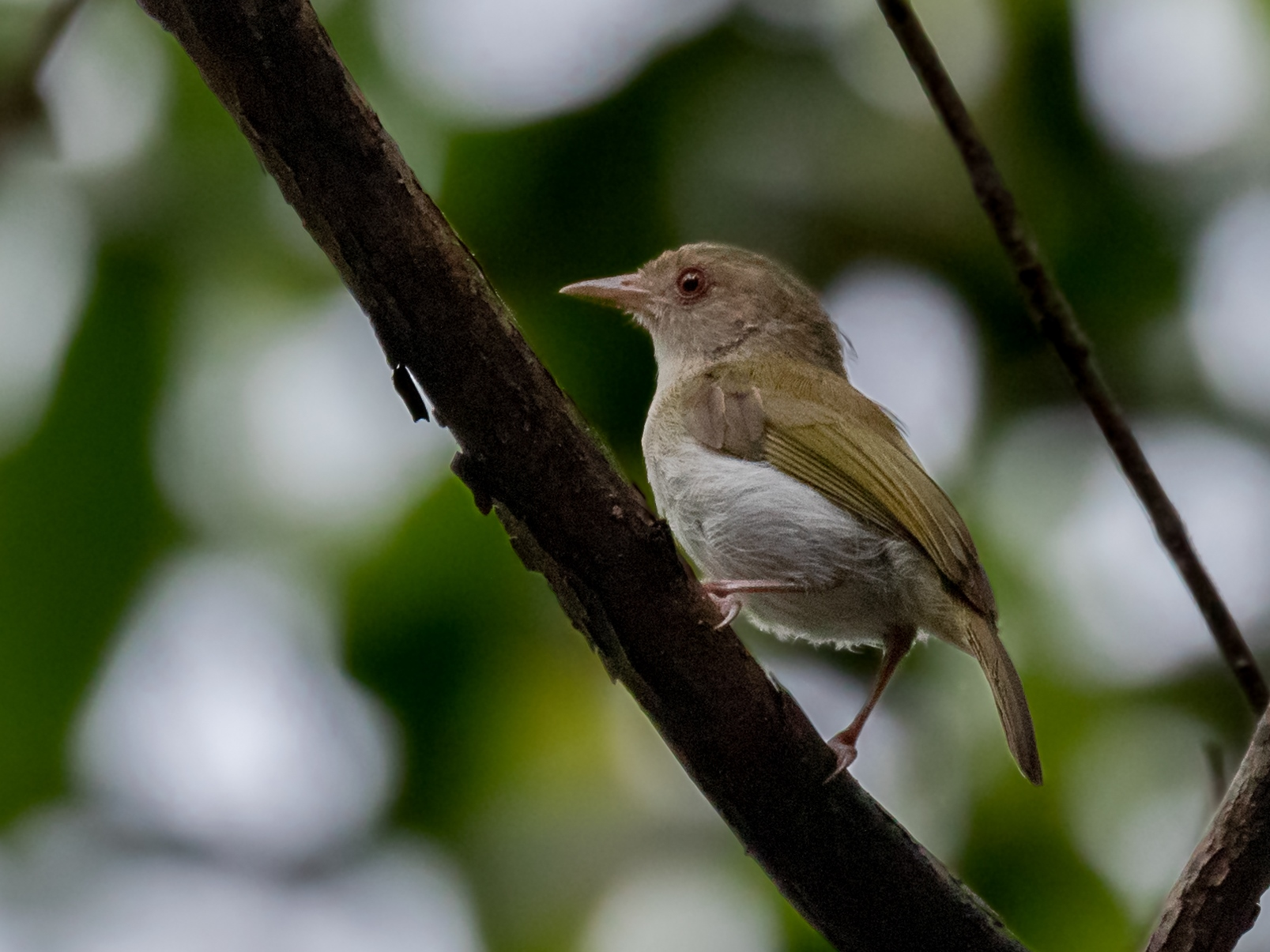

Conservation status
- Least Concern (IUCN 3.1)

Scientific classification
- Kingdom: Animalia
- Phylum: Chordata
- Class: Aves
- Order: Passeriformes
- Family: Vireonidae
- Genus: Hylophilus
- Species: H. brunneiceps

Binomial name
- Hylophilus brunneiceps PL Sclater, 1866

= Brown-headed greenlet =

Species of bird

The brown-headed greenlet (Hylophilus brunneiceps) is a species of bird in the family Vireonidae, the vireos, greenlets, and shrike-babblers. It is found in Brazil, Colombia and Venezuela.

== Taxonomy and systematics ==
The brown-headed greenlet is monotypic. However, what is now the inornata subspecies of the dusky-capped greenlet (Pachysylvia hypoxantha) was previously treated as a subspecies of it.

== Description ==
The brown-headed greenlet is about 11 to 12 cm (4.3 to 4.7 in) long and weighs 8 to 11.5 g (0.28 to 0.41 oz). The sexes have the same plumage. Adults have a brown or dull sepia crown with a slight yellowish wash. Their face is dull brownish. Their upperparts and tail are olive-green. Their wing's primaries and secondaries are dark grayish with thin greenish olive edges on their outer webs. Their throat and upper breast are dirty white with an olive-buff tinge. Their lower breast and belly are gray-white, their flanks yellowish, and their vent pale greenish yellow. They have a gray or whitish iris, a brown maxilla, a pinkish mandible, and pink legs and feet.

== Distribution and habitat ==
The brown-head greenlet is found from eastern Colombia east across most of southern Venezuela's Amazonas state and southeast into Brazil to the Negro River near Manaus. It inhabits scrubby low-stature forest on sandy soils, woodlands in savanna, blackwater river areas, and the edges of várzea forest. In elevation it reaches 400 m (1,300 ft) in Brazil and Colombia and at least 200 m (700 ft) in Venezuela.

== Behavior ==
=== Movement ===
The brown-headed greenlet is apparently a sedentary year-round resident.

=== Feeding ===
The brown-headed greenlet's diet has not been detailed but is known to include caterpillars and adult insects. It forages in pairs and family groups and sometimes joins mixed-species feeding flocks. It takes food while actively foraging among leaves, sometimes hanging upside-down to reach it, and also sometimes briefly hovers to capture it from the undersides of leaves. It typically forages between about 5 and 12 m (15 and 40 ft) above the ground.

=== Breeding ===
Nothing is known about the brown-headed greenlet's breeding biology.

=== Vocalization ===
The brown-headed greenlet's song is a "high, warbling weet-oh-weeréet". When agitated it makes "a series of twitters, then 4–5 soft notes and a louder, descending series of notes, much repeated".

== Status ==
The IUCN has assessed the brown-headed greenlet as being of Least Concern. It has a large range; though its population size is not known it is believed to be stable. No immediate threats have been identified. It is considered "frequent to uncommon" in Brazil and uncommon in Colombia and Venezuela.
