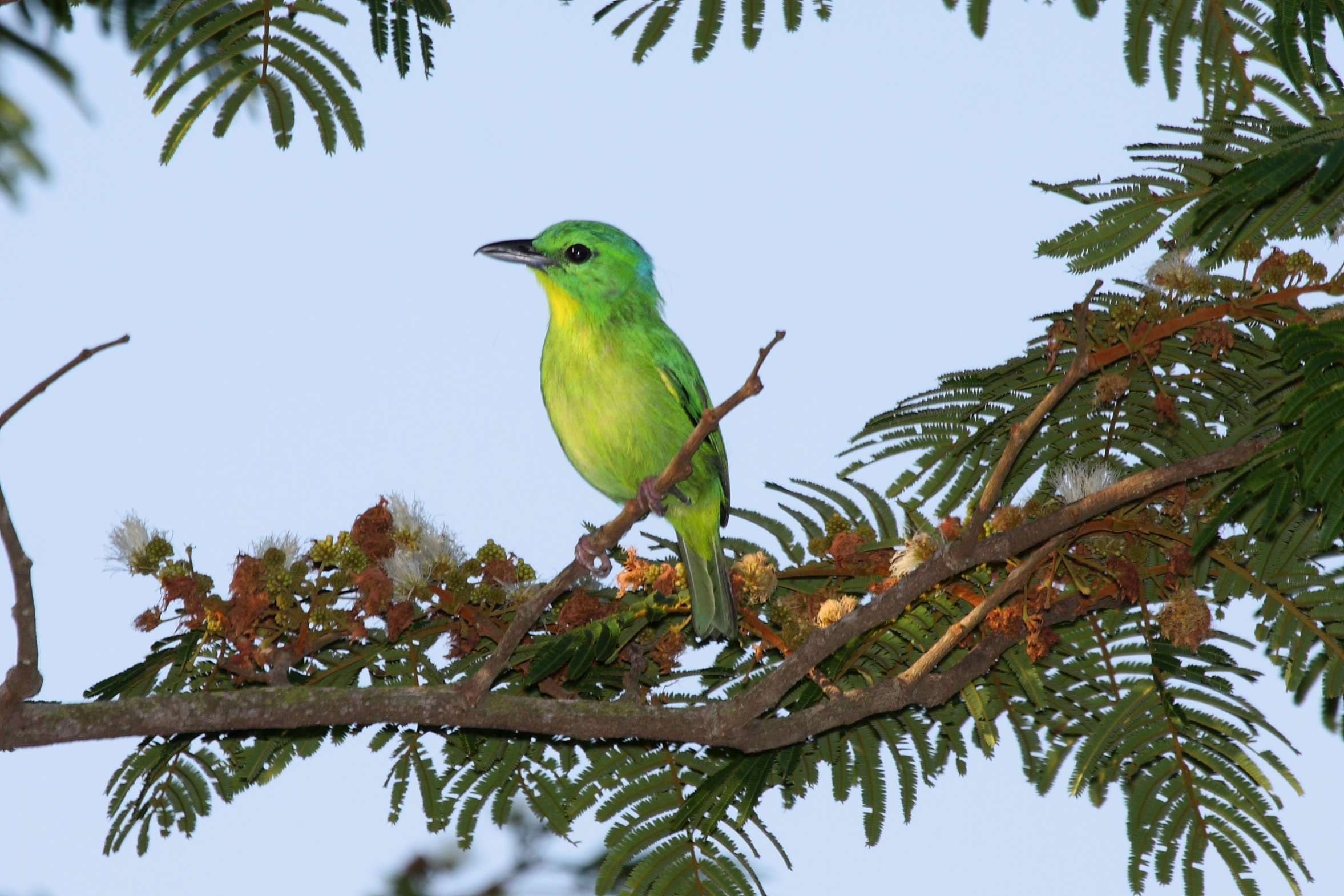
- Green shrike-vireo (Vireolanius pulchellus)

Scientific classification
- Kingdom: Animalia
- Phylum: Chordata
- Class: Aves
- Order: Passeriformes
- Family: Vireonidae
- Genus: Vireolanius; Bonaparte, 1850

Type species
- Vireolanius melitophrys Bonaparte, 1850

= Vireolanius =

Genus of birds

Vireolanius is a genus of bird in the family Vireonidae.

== Species ==
It contains the following species:

Image	Common name	Scientific name	Distribution
	Chestnut-sided shrike-vireo	Vireolanius melitophrys	Guatemala and Mexico.
	Green shrike-vireo	Vireolanius pulchellus	Belize, Colombia, Costa Rica, El Salvador, Guatemala, Honduras, Mexico, Nicaragua, and Panama.
	Yellow-browed shrike-vireo	Vireolanius eximius	Colombia, Panama and Venezuela.
	Slaty-capped shrike-vireo	Vireolanius leucotis	Bolivia, Brazil, Colombia, Ecuador, French Guiana, Guyana, Peru, Suriname, and Venezuela.
