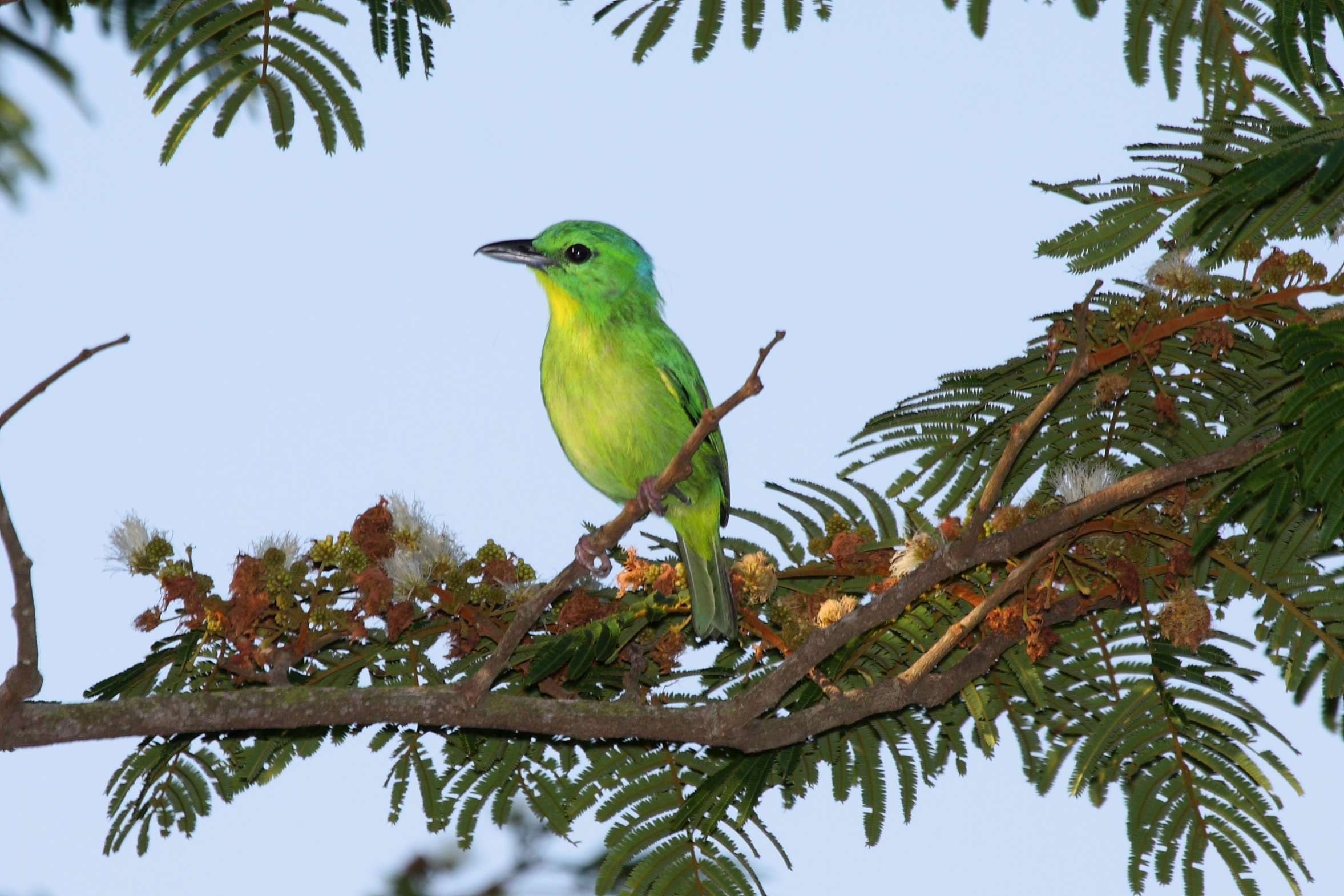
- In Panama

Conservation status
- Least Concern (IUCN 3.1)

Scientific classification
- Kingdom: Animalia
- Phylum: Chordata
- Class: Aves
- Order: Passeriformes
- Family: Vireonidae
- Genus: Vireolanius
- Species: V. pulchellus

Binomial name
- Vireolanius pulchellus Sclater, PL & Salvin, 1859

= Green shrike-vireo =

Species of bird

The green shrike-vireo (Vireolanius pulchellus) is a species of bird in the family Vireonidae, the vireos, greenlets, and shrike-babblers. It is found in Mexico and every Central American country.

== Taxonomy and systematics ==
The green shrike-vireo was originally described in 1859 as Vireolanius pulchellus, its present binomial. However, for a time in the early twentieth century it was placed in genus Smaragdolanius and its own family, Vireolaniidae. By the 1970s Smaragdolanius had been merged into Vireolanius and included in the family Vireonidae.

The green shrike-vireo has these four subspecies:

- V. p. ramosi Phillips, AR, 1991
- V. p. pulchellus Sclater, PL & Salvin, 1859
- V. p. verticalis Ridgway, 1885
- V. p. viridiceps Ridgway, 1903

What is now the yellow-browed shrike-vireo (V. eximius) was previously included as another subspecies. The green and yellow-browed shrike-vireos form a superspecies.

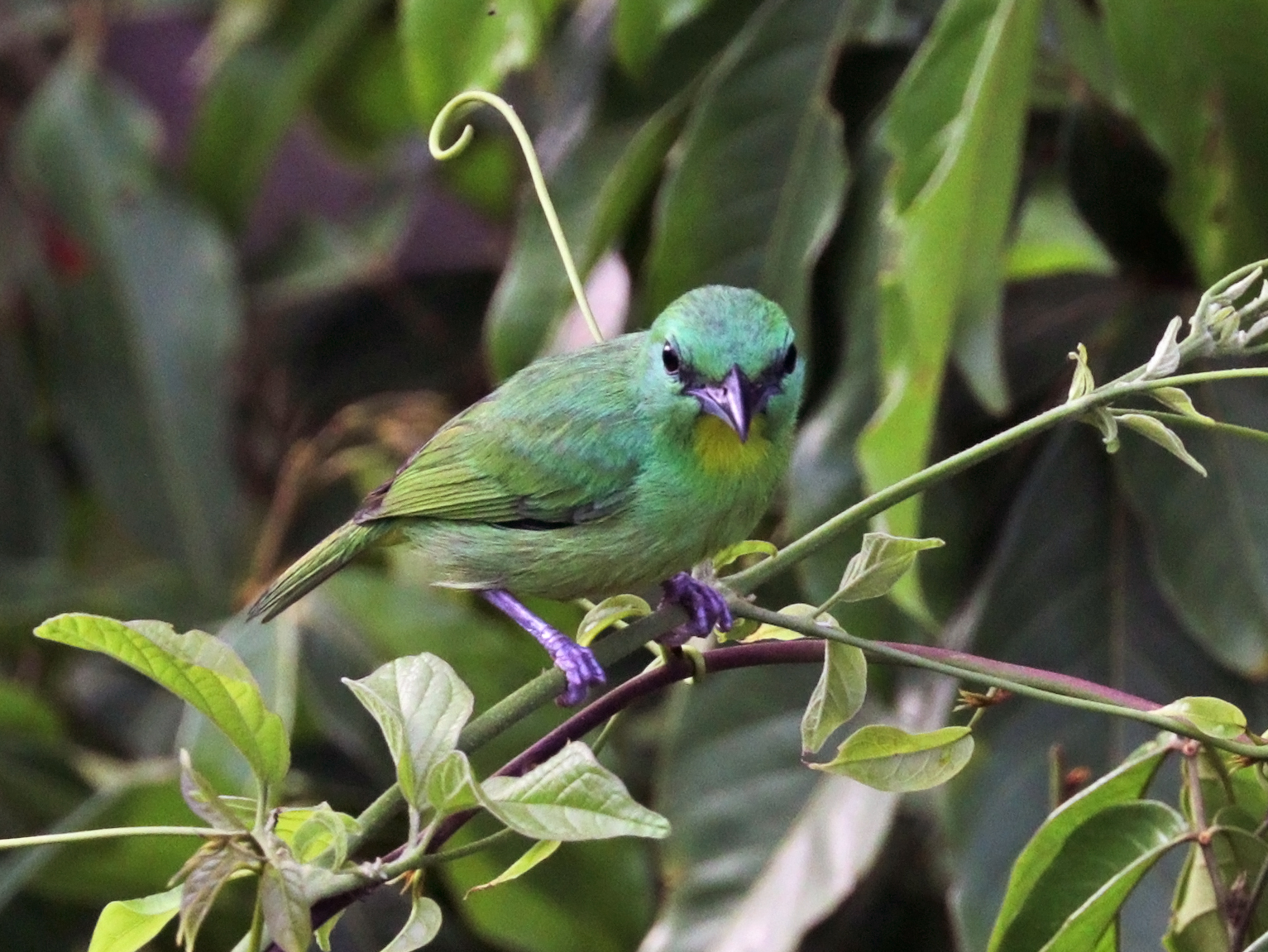
In Panama

== Description ==
The green shrike-vireo is 12 to 15 cm (4.7 to 5.9 in) long and weighs 22 to 30 g (0.78 to 1.1 oz). It is a bulky bird and a large member of its family. The sexes have the same plumage. They have a cerulean blue crown and nape with some green in the center of the crown. The sides of their head and their upperparts are bright green. Their chin and throat are yellow and the rest of their underparts mostly light yellowish green. The green is deeper on the flanks and the undertail coverts are greenish yellow. They have a brown iris, a black maxilla, a light gray with a darker base mandible, and gray legs and feet. Juveniles are mostly olive-green above and dull yellowish below. They have a bold yellow supercilium and two yellow wing bars.

Subspecies V. p. ramosi has a mostly to entirely blue head and nape. Its breast, sides, and flanks are a clearer, less greenish, yellow than the nominate's. V. p. verticalis has a mostly green head with blue only on the forehead and hindneck. V. p. viridiceps has a green head with blue only on the hindneck.

== Distribution and habitat ==
The subspecies of the green shrike-vireo are found thus:

- V. p. ramosi: southeastern Mexico from Veracruz east to Quintana Roo and south to Oaxaca
- V. p. pulchellus: Gulf/Caribbean slope from Campeche and Quintana Roo in southeastern Mexico south through Belize, eastern Guatemala and eastern Honduras into northern Nicaragua; intermittently on Pacific slope of Chiapas, western Guatemala, and northern El Salvador
- V. p. verticalis: Caribbean slopes of Nicaragua, Costa Rica, and western Panama to eastern Veraguas Province
- V. p. viridiceps: Pacific slope from the southern Gulf of Nicoya in Costa Rica into western Panama; Caribbean slope of central Panama to Panamá Province

The green shrike-vireo inhabits the interior and edges of humid evergreen and semi-deciduous forest in the tropical and lower subtropical zones. In elevation it ranges from sea level to 1,800 m (5,900 ft) in Mexico and northern Central America and to 1,200 m (3,900 ft) in Costa Rica.

== Behavior ==
=== Movement ===
The green shrike-vireo is a year-round resident.

=== Feeding ===
The green shrike-vireo feeds mostly on large arthropods including caterpillars and also includes fruit and seeds in its diet. It usually forages singly or in pairs and often joins mixed-species feeding flocks. It forages mostly in the forest canopy or just below it but will feed lower at the forest edge.

=== Breeding ===
A female green shrike-vireo was observed in May building a cup nest from moss. Nothing else is known about the species' breeding biology.

=== Vocalization ===
The green shrike-vireo's song has been described as "a repeated sweet peter-peter-peter or peer-peer-peer" and its call "a raspy djehr-djehr-djehr...". In Costa Rica it sings "peeta-peeta-peeta" on the Caribbean slope and "peer-peer-peer" on the Pacific slope.

== Status ==
The IUCN has assessed the green shrike-vireo as being of Least Concern. It has a large range; its estimated population of at least 50,000 mature individuals is believed to be decreasing. No immediate threats have been identified. It is fairly common to common in Mexico and Panama. In northern Central America it is uncommon on the Caribbean slope and rare and local on the Pacific. It is fairly common on both slopes of Costa Rica. "Human removal of appropriate habitat appears to be the largest potential threat to the Green Shrike-Vireo population."
