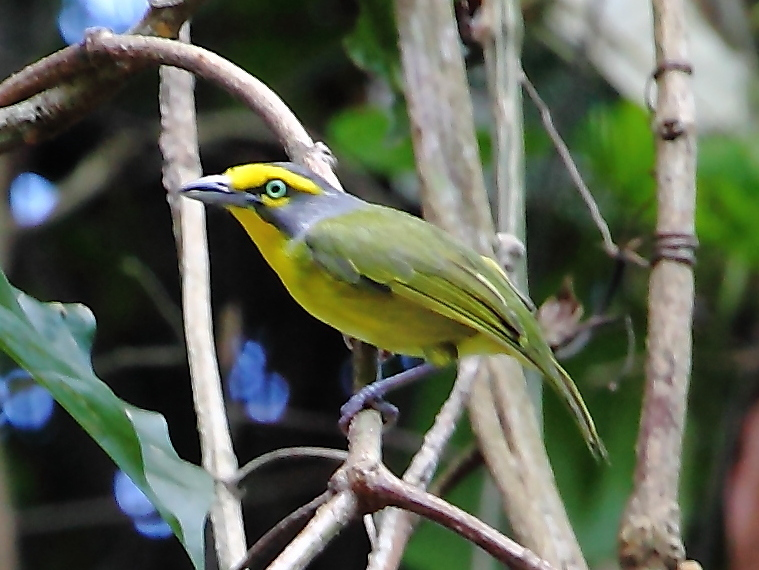
- at Apiacás, Mato Grosso state, Brazil
- Vireolanius leucotis - Slaty-capped Shrike-Vireo

Conservation status
- Least Concern (IUCN 3.1)

- Least Concern (IUCN 3.1)

Scientific classification
- Kingdom: Animalia
- Phylum: Chordata
- Class: Aves
- Order: Passeriformes
- Family: Vireonidae
- Genus: Vireolanius
- Species: V. leucotis

Binomial name
- Vireolanius leucotis (Swainson, 1838)
- Range of V. leucotis sensu stricto (without V. l. mikettae). See the Taxonomy and Distribution sections.

= Slaty-capped shrike-vireo =

Species of bird

The slaty-capped shrike-vireo (Vireolanius leucotis) is a species of bird in the family Vireonidae, the vireos, greenlets, and shrike-babblers. It is found in every mainland South American country except Argentina, Chile, Paraguay, and Uruguay.

== Taxonomy and systematics ==
The slaty-capped shrike-vireo was originally described in 1838 as Malaconotus leucotis. It was eventually placed in genus Vireolanius but for a time in the early twentieth century it was placed in genus Smaragdolanius and its own family, Vireolaniidae. By the 1970s Smaragdolanius had been merged into Vireolanius and included in the family Vireonidae.

The slaty-capped shrike-vireo's further taxonomy is unsettled. The IOC, the Clements taxonomy, and AviList assign it these four subspecies:

- V. l. mikettae Hartert, EJO, 1900
- V. l. leucotis (Swainson, 1838)
- V. l. simplex Berlepsch, 1912
- V. l. bolivianus Berlepsch, 1901

BirdLife International's Handbook of the Birds of the World (HBW) follows as 2014 publication and treats V. l. mikettae as a separate species, the pale-legged shrike-vireo. Clements recognizes that it is distinctive within the larger species by calling it the "slaty-capped shrike-vireo (pale-legged)". AviList also recognizes that this treatment as a separate species might be correct but is awaiting further evidence.

This article follows the one-species, four-subspecies model.

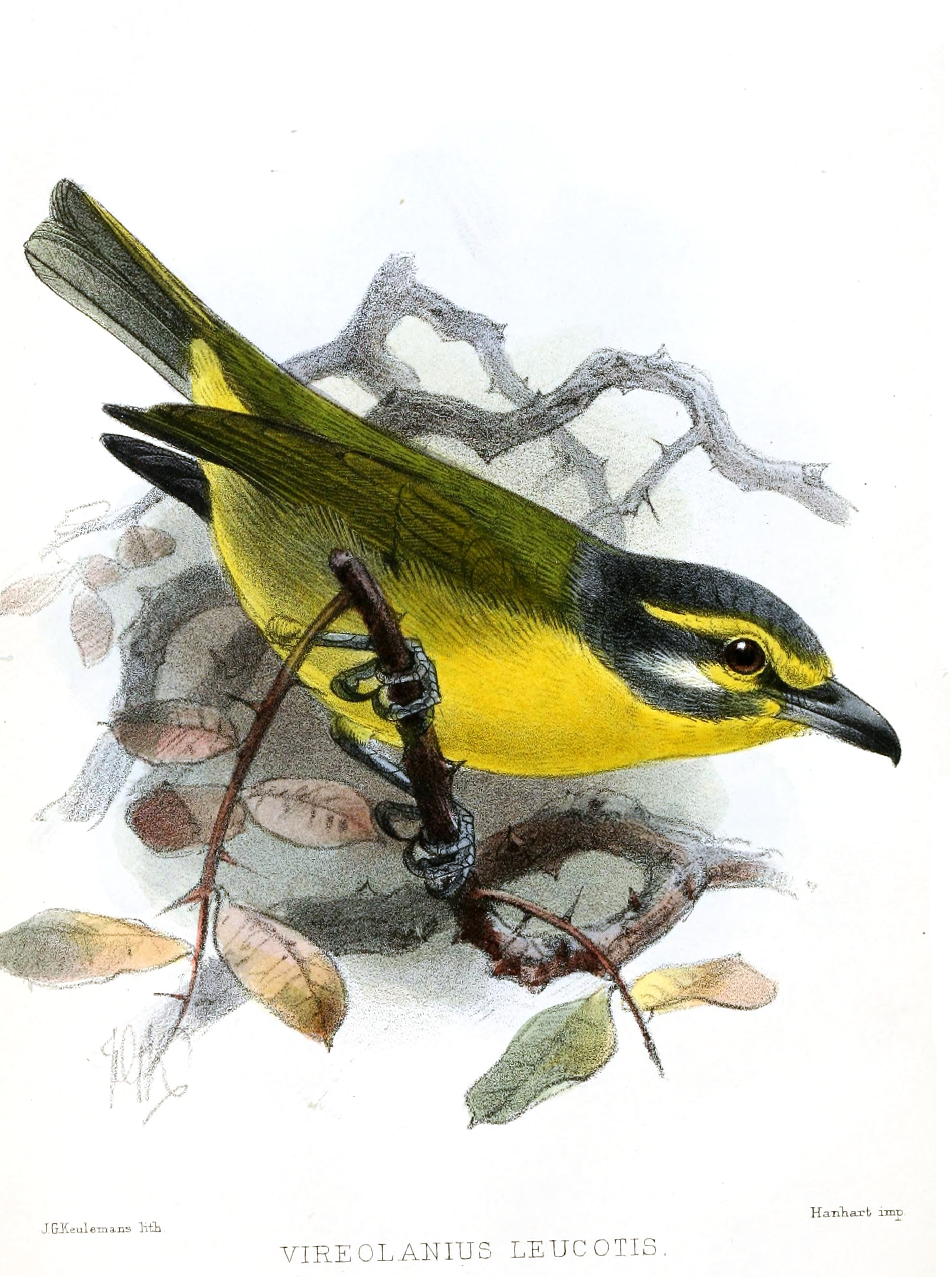
Vireolanius leucotis Keulemans 1878

== Description ==
The slaty-capped shrike-vireo is 14 to 15 cm (5.5 to 5.9 in) long; the nominate subspecies V. l. leucotis weighs 21.5 to 30 g (0.76 to 1.1 oz). The sexes have the same plumage. Adults of the nominate subspecies have a blue-gray crown and nape. They have a bright yellow forehead, supercilium, and crescent below the eye. Their lores are dull blackish gray. They have a deep grayish blue stripe through the eye and "moustache" on an otherwise dull white face. Their upperparts and tail are bright olive-green. Their flight feathers are mostly dull blackish gray with olive-green outer webs that show as a bright patch on the closed wing. Their chin, throat, and breast are bright lemon yellow, their belly a duller lemon yellow, their flanks duller greenish yellow, and their undertail coverts lemon yellow.

Subspecies V. l. simplex has a light green band on its forehead, a greenish front to the moustache, and an otherwise light gray face. Their nape is paler than the nominate's and their back is duller green with a grayish tinge. V. l. bolivianus has a blackish border across the forehead that continues above the supercilium; it is otherwise like the nominate. V. l. mikettae has a facial pattern like the nominate's but is olive where it is dull white. The yellow of its supercilium and underparts is deeper and brighter than the nominate's and its flanks are a darker olive green. All subspecies except V. l. mikettae have a pale green or lime-green iris, a black maxilla, a pale gray or leaden blue mandible, and pale gray or leaden blue legs and feet. V. l. mikettae has yellow to pinkish yellow legs and feet.

== Distribution and habitat ==
The slaty-capped shrike-vireo has a disjunct distribution; the range of V. l. mikettae is separate from the contiguous ranges of the other three subspecies. The subspecies are found thus:

- V. l. mikettae: west of the Andes from central Chocó Department in western Colombia south to Azuay Province in Ecuador
- V. l. leucotis: from Bolívar and Amazonas states in southern and eastern Venezuela south through extreme southeastern Colombia and eastern Ecuador into northern Peru's Department of San Martín; from there east through the Guianas and Brazil north of the Amazon to the Atlantic
- V. l. simplex: eastern Peru from Huánuco to Cuzo departments and east into Brazil south of the Amazon to the Tocantins River and south into northwestern Mato Grosso
- V. l. bolivianus: from Cuzco in Peru south into north-central Bolivia's La Paz, Cochabamba, and western Santa Cruz departments.

The slaty-capped shrike-vireo inhabits the canopy and edges of humid forest in the lowlands, foothills and lower parts of the highlands. In both Peru and Venezuela it is more common at the higher elevations than in the lowlands. In elevation it ranges from sea level to 1,800 m (5,900 ft) in Brazil. It is found between 300 and 2,000 m (1,000 and 6,600 ft) in Colombia, mostly below 1,100 m (3,600 ft) in Ecuador, up to 1,400 m (4,600 ft) in Peru, and between 200 and 1,300 m (700 and 4,300 ft) in Venezuela.

== Behavior ==
=== Movement ===
The slaty-capped shrike-vireo is apparently a sedentary year-round resident.

=== Feeding ===
The slaty-capped shrike-vireo feeds on arthropods and apparently favors caterpillars. It forages mostly from the forest's mid-story to its canopy. It typically forages singly, in pairs, or family groups and frequently leads mixed-species feeding flocks. It takes most prey from the underside of leaves and twigs.

=== Breeding ===
Nothing is known about the slaty-capped shrike-vireo's breeding biology.

=== Vocalization ===
The slaty-capped shrike-vireo's song is a "single loud melodious descending whistle tyeer or eear, seemingly endless repeated", with some variation among the subspecies. That of subspecies V. l. mikettae is the most distinctive; its whistles are longer than the others' and are on almost the same pitch rather than descending. The species also makes a "short nasal steeply downslurred note tjew" and a "short grating low-pitched note" written as "Rrek". The species sings especially when leading a mixed-species flock throughout the morning; it apparently functions to allow the flock to maintain itself.

== Status ==
The IUCN follows HBW taxonomy and so has separately assessed the slaty-capped sensu stricto and "pale-legged" shrike-vireos. Both are assesses as being of Least Concern. The population size of neither is known and both are believed to be decreasing. No immediate threats to either have been identified. It is considered uncommon in Colombia and Peru, uncommon to fairly common in Venezuela, and "frequent to uncommon" in Brazil. It occurs in several protected areas.
