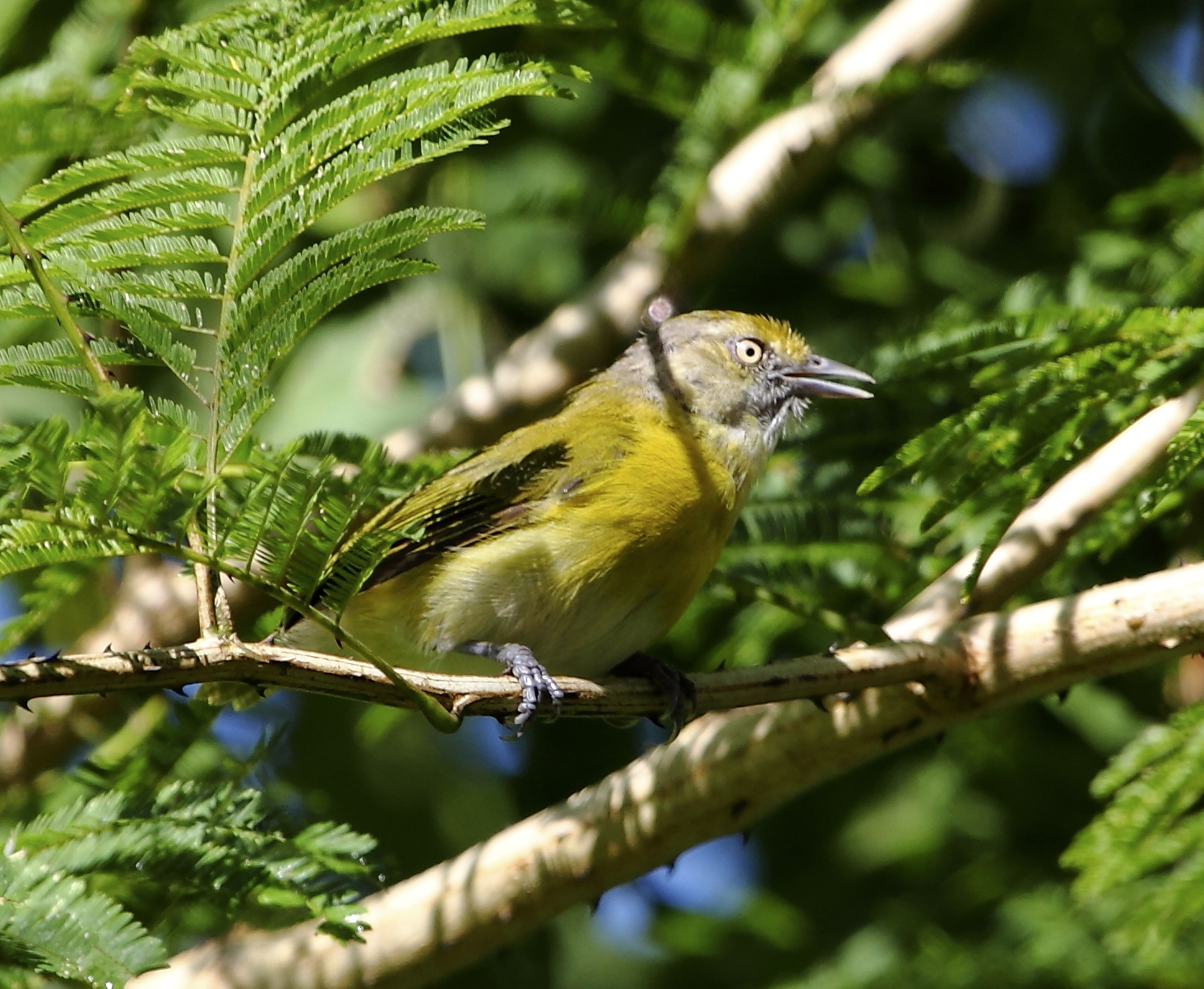

Conservation status
- Least Concern (IUCN 3.1)

- Least Concern (IUCN 3.1)

Scientific classification
- Kingdom: Animalia
- Phylum: Chordata
- Class: Aves
- Order: Passeriformes
- Family: Vireonidae
- Genus: Hylophilus
- Species: H. thoracicus

Binomial name
- Hylophilus thoracicus Temminck, 1822

= Lemon-chested greenlet =

Species of bird

The lemon-chested greenlet (Hylophilus thoracicus) is a species of bird in the family Vireonidae, the vireos, greenlets, and shrike-babblers. It is found in Bolivia, Brazil, Colombia, Ecuador, French Guiana, Guyana, Peru, Suriname, and Venezuela.

== Taxonomy and systematics ==
The lemon-chested greenlet's taxonomy is unsettled. The IOC, the Clements taxonomy, AviList, and the independent South American Classification Committee assign it these three subspecies:

- H. t. aemulus (Hellmayr, 1920)
- H. t. griseiventris Berlepsch & Hartert, EJO, 1902
- H. t. thoracicus Temminck, 1822

However, BirdLife International's Handbook of the Birds of the World (HBW) treats H. t. thoracicus as the Rio de Janeiro greenlet and, confusingly, the other two as the lemon-chested greenlet.

This article follows the IOC et al. one species, three-subspecies, model.

== Description ==
The lemon-chested greenlet is 10 to 13 cm (3.9 to 5.1 in) long and weighs 11 to 14 g (0.39 to 0.49 oz). The sexes have the same plumage. Adults of the nominate subspecies H. t. thoracicus have an ochraceous olive forehead, a dull grayish olive crown, and a wide grayish nape collar. They have grayish lores and sides of the head with a greenish tinge on the ear coverts. Their upperparts are bright olive that often has a yellowish tinge. Their wings' coverts and flight feathers are dull blackish gray with wide bright olive to yellowish green edges on the latter. Their tail is also dull blackish with wide bright olive to yellowish green feather edges. Their chin and throat are grayish to grayish white and their breast bright yellow. The rest of their underparts are pale creamy buff to whitish with a variable yellow tinge on the flanks, vent, and undertail coverts. Subspecies H. t. aemulus has less gray on the crown and more buffy throat and underparts than the nominate. H. t. griseiventris has a gray hindcrown, a gray throat, a greenish yellow breast, and gray lower underparts. Juveniles of all subspecies are essentially duller versions of the adults. Adults of all subspecies have a whitish to bright white iris with sometimes a yellow to pinkish tinge. They have a gray to dark maxilla, a white to pinkish mandible, and gray to pinkish legs and feet. Juveniles have a brown to dark gray-brown iris.

== Distribution and habitat ==
The lemon-chested greenlet has a disjunct distribution, with the nominate subspecies completely separate from the other two. The subspecies are found thus:

- H. t. aemulus: from extreme southeastern Colombia intermittently south through eastern Ecuador and eastern Peru into northern Bolivia
- H. t. griseiventris: Bolívar state in eastern Venezuela, east across the Guianas, and much of northern and central Amazonian Brazil
- H. t. thoracicus: eastern Brazil intermittently from southern Bahia south to northeastern São Paulo state

The lemon-chested greenlet inhabits a wide variety of wooded landscapes. These include terra firme, várzea forest, the transitional forest between those two, gallery forest, restinga, cloudforest, and wooded urban areas. In elevation it ranges in Brazil mostly from sea level to 600 m (2,000 ft) though locally higher. It reaches 500 m (1,600 ft) in Colombia, 400 m (1,300 ft) in Ecuador, 850 m (2,800 ft) in Peru, and 700 m (2,300 ft) in Venezuela.

== Behavior ==
=== Movement ===
The lemon-chested greenlet is a year-round resident.

=== Feeding ===
The lemon-chested greenlet feeds on arthropods and small fruits. It typically forages singly or in pairs and regularly joins mixed-species feeding flocks. It forages actively from the forest's mid-story to its canopy, taking food from foliage and flowers and often hanging upside-down to do so.

=== Breeding ===
The lemon-chested greenlet appears to have a nesting period from September to late May. Its nest is a cup suspended in a branch fork; its materials have not been studied. The clutch size, incubation period, and time to fledging are not known. Both parents incubate the clutch and provision nestlings.

=== Vocalization ===
The lemon-chested greenlet's song is a "very high, rapid series of 10-15 upslurred tu-Weéet notes". Its call is a "rich, whistled where-it sometimes doubled ".

== Status ==
The IUCN follows HBW taxonomy and so has separately assessed the lemon-chested sensu stricto and Rio de Janeiro greenlets. Both are assessed as being of Least Concern. The former has a very large range and the latter a smaller one. Neither taxon's population size is known and both are believed to be decreasing. No immediate threat to either has been identified. The lemon-chested greenlet sensu lato is considered uncommon in Colombia, "rare and seemingly local" in Ecuador, "uncommon and local" in Peru, "locally fairly common" in Venezuela, and "frequent to uncommon" in Brazil. It is found in many protected areas in Brazil and at least one in each of Colombia and Peru.
