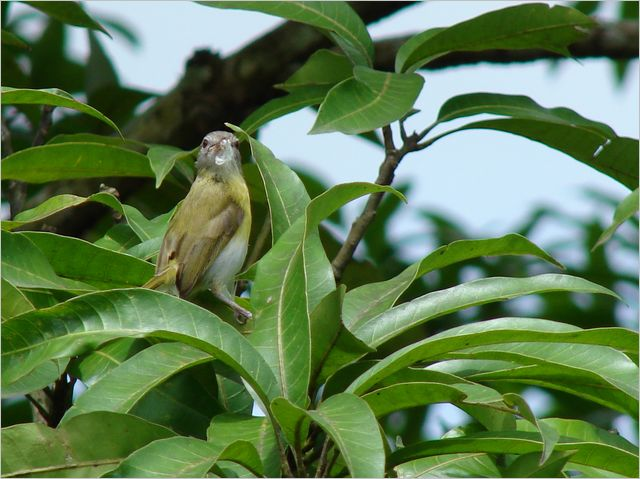
- Ashy-headed greenlet (Hylophilus pectoralis)

Scientific classification
- Kingdom: Animalia
- Phylum: Chordata
- Class: Aves
- Order: Passeriformes
- Family: Vireonidae
- Genus: Hylophilus; Temminck, 1822

Type species
- Hylophilus poicilotis Temminck, 1822

= Hylophilus =

Genus of birds

Hylophilus is a genus of birds in the vireo family Vireonidae that are found in South America.

== Taxonomy ==
The genus Hylophilus was introduced in 1822 by the Dutch zoologist Coenraad Jacob Temminck who included two species in the genus but did not specify the type. In 1840 the English zoologist George Gray designated the type as Hylophilus poicilotis Temminck, the rufous-crowned greenlet. The genus name combines the Ancient Greek ὑλη/hulē meaning "woodland" or "forest" with φιλος/philos meaning "loving".

The genus contains eight species:

Image	Common name	Scientific name	Distribution
	Grey-eyed greenlet	Hylophilus amaurocephalus	Bolivia and Brazil.
	Rufous-crowned greenlet	Hylophilus poicilotis	Argentina, Bolivia, Brazil and Paraguay
	Olivaceous greenlet	Hylophilus olivaceus	Ecuador and Peru.
	Ashy-headed greenlet	Hylophilus pectoralis	Bolivia, Brazil, French Guiana, Guyana, Peru, Suriname, and Venezuela.
	Brown-headed greenlet	Hylophilus brunneiceps	Brazil, Colombia and Venezuela.
	Lemon-chested greenlet	Hylophilus thoracicus	Bolivia, Brazil, Colombia, Ecuador, French Guiana, Guyana, Peru, Suriname, and Venezuela.
	Scrub greenlet	Hylophilus flavipes	Costa Rica, Panama, Colombia, Venezuela and Tobago.
	Grey-chested greenlet	Hylophilus semicinereus	Bolivia, Brazil, Colombia, French Guiana, Peru, and Venezuela.
	Beni greenlet	Hylophilus moxensis	Bolivia
