= Rufous-crowned greenlet =

- At Teresópolis, Brazil

Conservation status
- Least Concern (IUCN 3.1)

Scientific classification
- Kingdom: Animalia
- Phylum: Chordata
- Class: Aves
- Order: Passeriformes
- Family: Vireonidae
- Genus: Hylophilus
- Species: H. poicilotis

Binomial name
- Hylophilus poicilotis Temminck, 1822

Species of bird

The rufous-crowned greenlet (Hylophilus poicilotis) is a species of bird in the family Vireonidae, the vireos, greenlets, and shrike-babblers. It is found in Argentina, Brazil, Paraguay, and possibly Bolivia.

== Taxonomy and systematics ==
The rufous-crowned greenlet is monotypic. However, for much of the twentieth century what is now the grey-eyed greenlet (Hylophilus amaurocephalus) was treated as a subspecies of it. By the 1990s they were generally recognized as separate species.

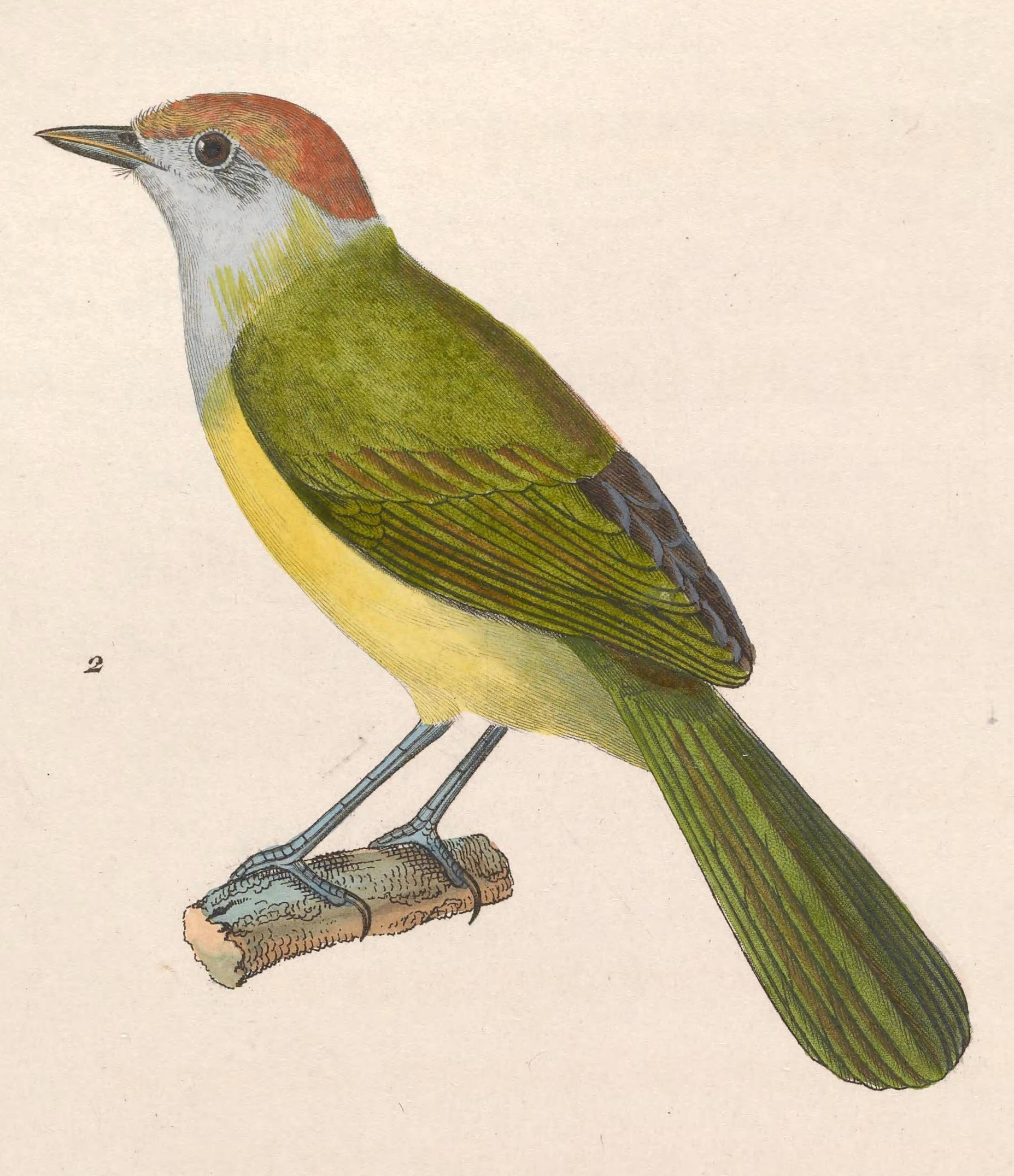
Hylophilus poicilotis 1838

== Description ==
The rufous-crowned greenlet is about 12.5 cm (4.9 in) long and weighs 9 to 12 g (0.32 to 0.42 oz). The sexes have the same plumage. Adults have a bright chestnut-brown forehead and crown and mottled grayish black ear coverts. Their nape, upper back, and shoulders are olive-green and their lower back and rump are a brighter green. Their wings are dull grayish black with thin greenish edges on the outer webs of the primaries and secondaries and yellow-green edges on the inner webs of the tertials. Their tail is grayish green with brighter greenish edges on the feathers' outer webs. Their throat is dull pale gray, their upper breast yellowish gray, their lower breast dull yellow, their flanks and belly a brighter yellow, and their vent dull yellowish. They have a dark reddish brown iris, a dull blackish maxilla, a gray to dusky pink mandible, and grayish legs and feet. Immatures are similar to adults but with a more olivaceous back and brighter underparts.

== Distribution and habitat ==
The rufous-crowned greenlet is found in southeastern Brazil from southern Mato Grosso do Sul south into Rio Grande do Sul, across eastern Paraguay, and into northeastern Argentina's Misiones Province. In addition, the South American Classification Committee has unconfirmed reports from Bolivia. It inhabits moist to humid forest, woodlands, scrublands, and mature secondary forest. In elevation it ranges from sea level to 1,800 m (5,900 ft).

== Behavior ==
=== Movement ===
The rufous-crowned greenlet is apparently a sedentary year-round resident.

=== Feeding ===
The rufous-crowned greenlet feeds on mostly on arthropods and includes some fruits its diet. It forages mostly in the forest canopy but will feed all the way down to near the ground. It typically forages singly, in pairs, or in family groups and regularly joins mixed-species feeding flocks. It takes food mostly by gleaning while perched and only rarely takes insects in mid-air.

=== Breeding ===
The rufous-crowned greenlet's breeding season has not been defined but apparently includes September. Nothing else is known about the species' breeding biology.

=== Vocalization ===
The rufous-crowned greenlet's song is a "rapid, high teweét-teweét- - (3-6 x) or rapid swee-swee- - (4-5 x)". There is much variation throughout the species' range. When it groups it makes chek or chi-chek contact calls.

== Status ==
The IUCN has assessed the rufous-crowned greenlet as being of Least Concern. It has a large range; its population size is not known and is believed to be stable. No immediate threats have been identified. It is considered "common to frequent" in Brazil.
