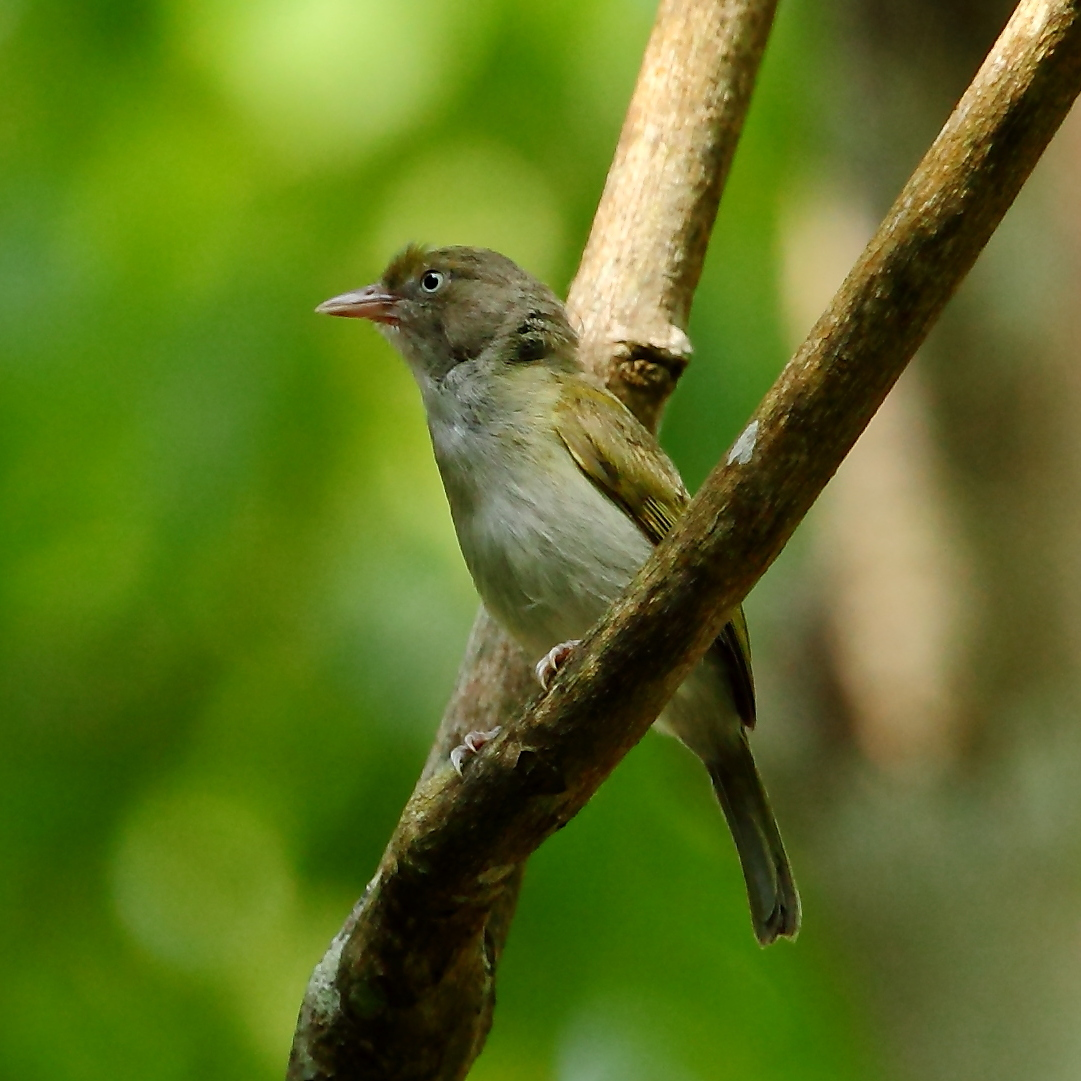
- At Iranduba, Amazonas state, Brazil

Conservation status
- Least Concern (IUCN 3.1)

Scientific classification
- Kingdom: Animalia
- Phylum: Chordata
- Class: Aves
- Order: Passeriformes
- Family: Vireonidae
- Genus: Hylophilus
- Species: H. semicinereus

Binomial name
- Hylophilus semicinereus Sclater, PL & Salvin, 1867

= Grey-chested greenlet =

Species of bird

The grey-chested greenlet (Hylophilus semicinereus) is a species of bird in the family Vireonidae, the vireos, greenlets, and shrike-babblers. It is found in Bolivia, Brazil, French Guiana, Peru, Venezuela, and possibly Colombia.

== Taxonomy and systematics ==
The grey-chested greenlet has three subspecies, the nominate H. s. semicinereus (Sclater, PL & Salvin, 1867), H. s. viridiceps (Todd, 1929), and H. s. juruanus (Gyldenstolpe, 1941).

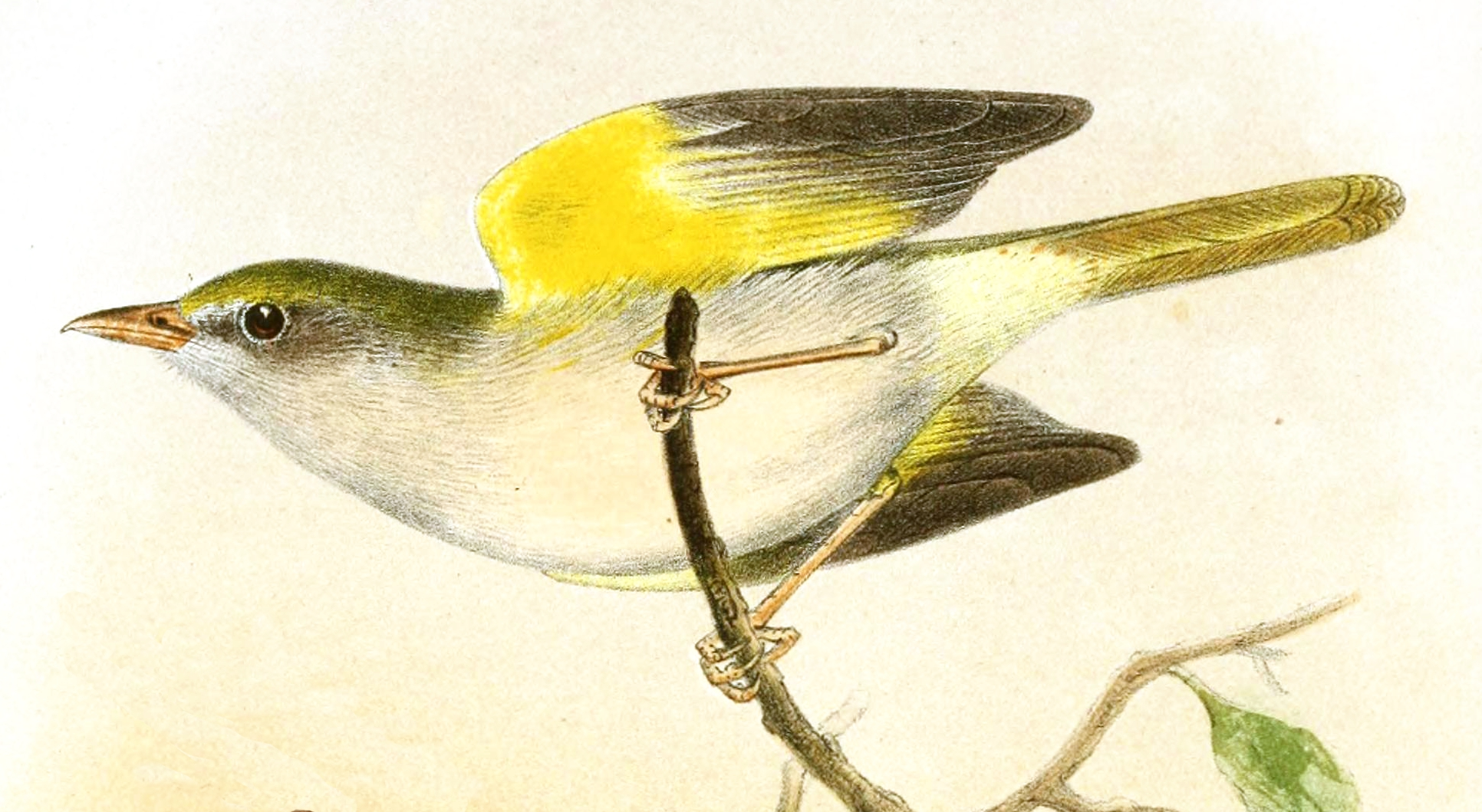
Hylophilus semicinereus illustration by Joseph Smit, 1867

== Description ==
The grey-chested greenlet is about 12 cm (4.7 in) long; one individual weighed 13 g (0.46 oz). The sexes have the same plumage. Adults of the nominate subspecies have a grayish green forehead and a grayer crown. Their lores and the sides of their face are buffy and their ear coverts gray-buff. Their upperparts are greenish. Their wings' primaries and secondaries are blackish gray with greenish edges and the tertials are blackish gray with yellow edges on the inner webs. Their tail is dull olive-green with brighter green edges on the feathers. Their chin is whitish gray, their throat dull gray, their breast gray with a greenish yellow-tinge that is brighter on the side, their upper belly dull buff-white, and their lower belly gray-white with a slight yellow tinge. Subspecies H. s. viridiceps has less gray on the crown than the nominate, with paler and more whitish underparts that have a paler greenish wash on the breast. H. s. juruanus has a heavy olive-brown tinge on the head and nape and is otherwise overall paler than the nominate. All subspecies have a whitish to gray iris, a grayish maxilla, a pinkish mandible with a grayish tip, and dull gray-brown legs and feet.

== Distribution and habitat ==
The subspecies of the grey-chested greenlet are found thus:

- H. s. viridiceps: southern Venezuela's Amazonas and Bolívar states, eastern French Guiana, and northern Brazil to the Solimões (upper Amazon) and main Amazon perhaps as far east as the Madeira River; perhaps also in eastern Colombia (Note: Though some sources place the grey-chested greenlet possibly or definitely in Colombia others do not and the South American Classification Committee has no confirmed records in that country.)
- H. s. semicinereus: northern Brazil south of the Amazon in Pará, Maranhão, northern Mato Grosso, and western Tocantins and into extreme northeastern Bolivia
- H. s. juruanus: south of the upper Amazon/Solimões from northeastern Peru into northwestern Brazil to the Purus River

The grey-chested greenlet inhabits the canopy, edges, and clearings of humid forest including várzea, permanently flooded forest, and secondary forest. It favors areas with a relatively low canopy. In elevation it ranges from sea level to 400 m (1,300 ft) in Brazil and up to 350 m (1,100 ft) in Venezuela.

== Behavior ==
=== Movement ===
The grey-chested greenlet is apparently a sedentary year-round resident.

=== Feeding ===
The grey-chested greenlet feeds mostly on small insects. It forages mostly in the outer foliage and often hangs upside-down to glean prey from leaves. It often joins mixed-species feeding flocks.

=== Breeding ===
Nothing is known about the grey-chested greenlet's breeding biology.

=== Vocalization ===
The grey-chested greenlet's song is a "very high, hurried wee-wee-wee... (about 8-20 x, but often too fast to count".

== Status ==
The IUCN has assessed the grey-chested greenlet as being of Least Concern. It has a very large range; its population size is not known but is believed to be stable. No immediate threats have been identified. It is considered "common to frequent" in Brazil, "uncommon and possibly local" in Venezuela, and "local" in Peru.
