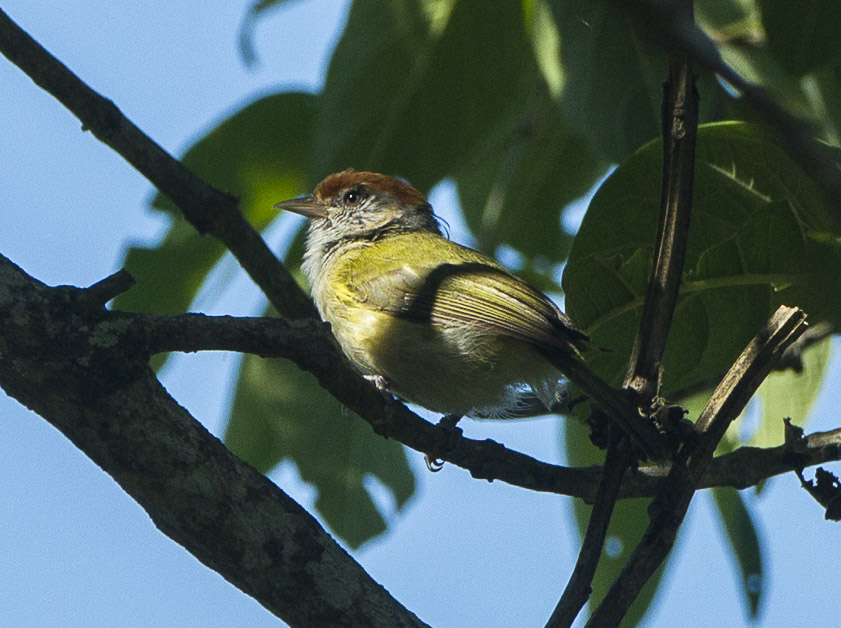

Conservation status
- Least Concern (IUCN 3.1)

Scientific classification
- Kingdom: Animalia
- Phylum: Chordata
- Class: Aves
- Order: Passeriformes
- Family: Vireonidae
- Genus: Hylophilus
- Species: H. amaurocephalus

Binomial name
- Hylophilus amaurocephalus (Nordmann, 1835)

= Grey-eyed greenlet =

Species of bird

The grey-eyed greenlet (Hylophilus amaurocephalus) is a species of bird in the family Vireonidae, the vireos, greenlets, and shrike-babblers. It is found in Brazil and possibly Bolivia.

== Taxonomy and systematics ==
The grey-eyed greenlet was originally described in 1835 as Sylvia amaurocephala, mistakenly placing it among what were then the "Old World warblers". For much of the twentieth century it was treated as a subspecies of the rufous-crowned greenlet (Hyophilus poicilotis) but by the 1990s was generally recognized as a full species.

The grey-eyed greenlet is monotypic.

== Description ==
The grey-eyed greenlet is 12.5 to 13 cm (4.9 to 5.1 in) long. The sexes have the same plumage. Adults have a chestnut-brown forehead and crown and a pale grayish supercilium, and they are mottled gray-white around the eye and on the ear coverts. Their nape and upper back are dull gray-brown, and their lower back, shoulders, and rump are green-tinged gray-brown. Their wings are gray-brown with thin greenish edges on the outer webs of the primaries and secondaries. Their tail is gray-green with brighter edges on the feathers' outer webs. Their chin is dull whitish, their throat is dull grayish, their flanks are yellowish, and the rest of their underparts are brownish gray. They have a light gray to medium gray iris, a gray maxilla, a gray-brown mandible, and dark gray legs and feet.

== Distribution and habitat ==
The grey-eyed greenlet is found in northeastern Brazil from Piauí and Ceará south to São Paulo state. In addition, there are records in northern Bolivia's Beni Department but the South American Classification Committee treats the species as unconfirmed in that country. It inhabits caatinga, scrublands, brushy pastures, woodlands, and the edges of forest. In elevation it ranges from near sea level to 1,800 m (5,900 ft).

== Behavior ==
=== Movement ===
The grey-eyed greenlet is apparently a sedentary year-round resident.

=== Feeding ===
The grey-eyed greenlet feeds on arthropods and includes many fruits its diet. It forages fairly low in the forest, usually between about 1 and 10 m (5 and 35 ft) above the ground. It typically forages in pairs or family groups and regularly joins mixed-species feeding flocks.

=== Breeding ===
The grey-eyed greenlet's breeding season has not been defined but includes January. The one described nest was a cup made from moss and plant down. It was suspended in a forked twig amid dense vines about 5 m (15 ft) above the ground. The clutch size, incubation period, time to fledging, and details of parental care are not known.

=== Vocalization ===
The grey-eyed greenlet's song is a "high, rather harsh see-see or te Teé-te Teé-te Teé and many other variations".

== Status ==
The IUCN has assessed the grey-eyed greenlet as being of Least Concern. It has a large range; its population size is not known and is believed to be stable. No immediate threats have been identified. It is considered "frequent to uncommon" in Brazil. It is adaptable and "occurs in substantially modified habitats...including regenerating pastures and irregularly fire-burnt woodlands".
