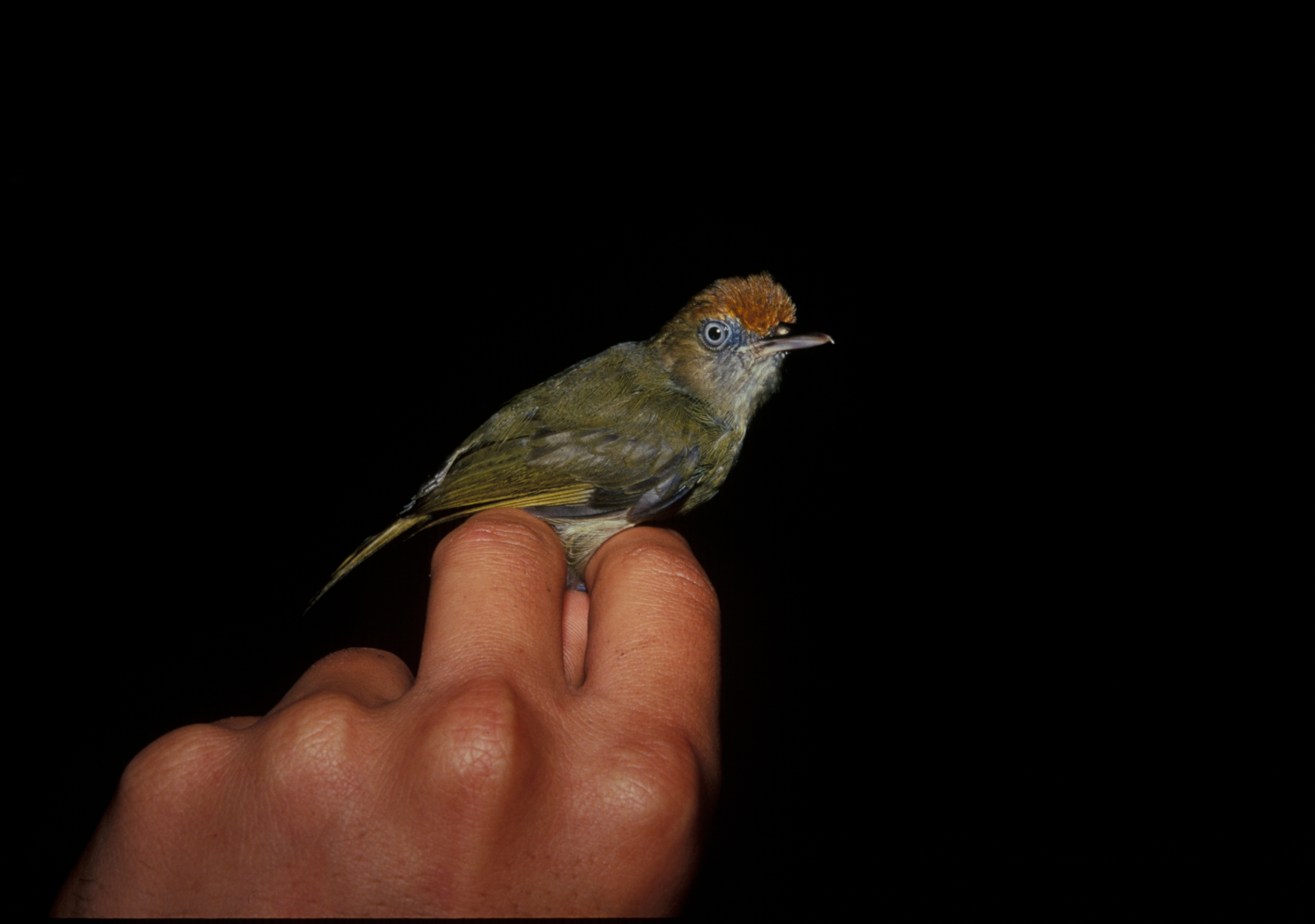

Scientific classification
- Kingdom: Animalia
- Phylum: Chordata
- Class: Aves
- Order: Passeriformes
- Family: Vireonidae
- Genus: Tunchiornis
- Species: T. ochraceiceps

Binomial name
- Tunchiornis ochraceiceps (Sclater, PL, 1860)

Synonyms
- See text

= Ochre-crowned brownlet =

Species of bird

The ochre-crowned brownlet or ochre-crowned greenlet (Tunchiornis ochraceiceps) is a species of bird in the family Vireonidae, the vireos, greenlets, and shrike-babblers. It is found in Mexico, in every Central American country except El Salvador, and in Colombia and Ecuador. This species was formerly known as the tawny-crowned greenlet and was considered to be conspecific with the Para brownlet, Guianan greenlet and rufous-fronted brownlet.

== Taxonomy and systematics ==
The ochre-crowned brownlet was formally described in 1860 as Hylophilus ochraceiceps by the English zoologist Philip Sclater. The specimen had been collected in the state of Oaxaca of southwestern Mexico by the French ornithologist Adolphe Boucard. The specific epithet combines the Modern Latin ochraceus meaning "ochraceous" with -ceps meaning "-capped". The species is now placed in the genus Tunchiornis that was introduced in 2014.

The IOC and AviList recognize these five subspecies:

- T. o. ochraceiceps (Sclater, PL, 1860) – Gulf lowlands of southern Mexico to Guatemala
- T. o. pallidipectus (Ridgway, R, 1903) – southern Guatemala and Honduras to northwestern Panama
- T. o. pacificus (Parkes, KC, 1991) – southeastern Costa Rica and western Panama
- T. o. nelsoni (Todd, WEC, 1929) – eastern Panama (Veraguas to Darién Province)
- T. o. bulunensis (Hartert, EJO, 1902) – far eastern Panama to Pacific coast of Colombia and western Ecuador

The Para brownlet (Tunchiornis rubrifrons), Guianan brownlet (Tunchiornis luteifrons), and rufous-fronted brownlet (Tunchiornis ferrugineifrons) were formerly considered to be subspecies of what was then known as the tawny-crowned greenlet. Following the split most systems changed the English name of T. ochraceiceps to ochre-crowned brownlet. They are now treated as separate species based on a study of the Tunchiornis ochraceiceps complex by Nelson Buainain and collaborators that was published in 2021. Although the differences in plumage and vocalization are small, the taxa are separable by mitochondrial and nuclear genetic data.

However, as of July 2026 the ochre-crowned brownlet's taxonomy is unsettled. The Clements taxonomy does not recognize T. o. pacificus but includes it within T. o. pallidipectus. BirdLife International's Handbook of the Birds of the World (HBW) recognizes only T. o. ochraceiceps and T. o. bulunensis of the five but also includes T. o. ferrugineifrons that the other systems treat as the rufous-fronted brownlet. HBW also retained the English name tawny-crowned greenlet. And in July 2026 the South American Classification Committee renamed all members of Tunchiornis "brownlet". They made the change because the genus Tunchiornis is not closely related to the other genera of greenlets and because its species are more brown than green. (Note: The SACC adopted the split in February 2026 and between then and July called T. ochraceiceps the "northern tawny-crowned greenlet". At the same time that they adopted "brownlet" they deleted "tawny-crowned" and adopted the other systems' prefix of "ochre-crowned" for the species.)

== Description ==
The ochre-crowned brownlet is 9.5 to 13 cm (3.7 to 5.1 in) long and weighs 8.4 to 13.5 g (0.30 to 0.48 oz). The sexes have the same plumage. Adults of the nominate subspecies T. o. ochraceiceps have a yellowish forehead and a yellow-brown crown. Their face is mostly dull grayish. Their upperparts are olive-brown that is slightly more greenish on the rump. Their wings' primaries and secondaries are grayish black with buff-brown edges on the outer webs. Their tail is dull brown with cinnamon-brown edges on the feathers. Their chin is mottled grayish white, their throat gray with a faint yellow-green tinge, their breast ochraceous, their flanks yellowish gray, their belly's center yellow, and their vent grayish yellow. Their underwing coverts are yellow. They have a pale gray iris, a gray maxilla, a paler mandible, and pinkish to grayish legs and feet.

The other subspecies of the ochre-crowned brownle differ from the nominate and each other thus:

- T. o. pallidipectus: paler throat and underparts than nominate with pale buffy breast, grayer flanks, and pale yellow underwing coverts
- T. o. pacificus: darker gray throat and underparts than pallidipectus with little or no yellow on the belly, brownish gray flanks, and pale yellow underwing coverts
- T. o. nelsoni: tawny forehead and crown, olive-greenish upperparts with olive-brown middle back and wing coverts, and pale dingy greenish yellow underparts
- T. o. bulunensis: darker olive-green upperparts than nominate with bright greenish yellow underparts

== Distribution and habitat ==
The ochre-crowned brownlet is a year-round resident that is found from southern Mexico through Central America to the Pacific coast region of Colombia and northern Ecuador. It is found in low altitude humid evergreen forests from sea level to 1,300 m (4,300 ft). It inhabits "mature wet forest" in Costa Rica up to 1,300 m (4,300 ft). Field guides to Colombia place it in humid forest, in the former country to 800 m (2,600 ft) and in the latter mostly below 700 m (2,300 ft).

== Behavior ==
=== Feeding ===
The ochre-crowned brownlett's diet has not been detailed for all subspecies, but where it is known it is primarily arthropods including insects and spiders and occasionally includes small berries. Where it has been observed, it forages from the forest's lower levels to its mid-story. It takes prey by gleaning from live and dead foliage while perched or with a short sally. It feeds actively, making frequent short flights between trees, and is often quite acrobatic, hanging upside-down to forage. It often joins mixed-species feeding flocks and in Mexico has been observed attending army ant swarms.

=== Breeding ===
Most subspecies of the ochre-crowned brownlet are seen in pairs or small family groups, suggesting a year-round monogamous relationship. Its breeding season has not been defined for all subspecies but includes April to July in Belize, March and April perhaps to August in Costa Rica, and July and January in Panama. The few known nests were cups made from various plant fibers, covered with moss, and placed in a horizontal branch fork or woven among small branches. The only known clutches were of one or two eggs. The incubation period is not known. The only observed time to fledging was 13 to 14 days after hatch. One individual did all of the incubation; both parents provisioned nestlings.

=== Vocalization ===
The ochre-crowned brownlet's vocalizations vary across its range. In Central America and Colombia its song is described as a "pure whistle that is steadily repeated many times at intervals of a few seconds" and is flat-pitched or slightly ascending. It has been written as "wi-seeeeee or wi-heeeeee". It also makes a "rapidly repeated rising nasal note: nya-nya-nya-nya".

== Conservation status ==
The IUCN follows HBW taxonomy and so has not separately assessed the ochre-crowned brownlet sensu stricto from the combined ochre-crowned and rufous-fronted brownlets. The ochre-crowned brownlet is considered fairly common in northern Central America and Costa Rica. and it is uncommon in Colombia. All of the ochre-crowned brownlet's subspecies are primarily dependent on large tracts undisturbed forest, so forest fragmentation is a threat across its range.
