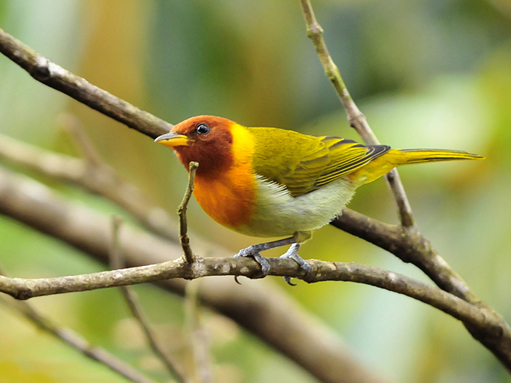
- Rufous-headed tanager, Hemithraupis ruficapilla

Scientific classification
- Kingdom: Animalia
- Phylum: Chordata
- Class: Aves
- Order: Passeriformes
- Family: Thraupidae
- Genus: Hemithraupis; Cabanis, 1851

Type species
- Hylophilus ruficeps = Nemosia ruficapilla zu Wied, 1831

Species
- 3, see text

= Hemithraupis =

Genus of birds

Hemithraupis is a small genus of passerine birds in the tanager family Thraupidae found in the forests of South America.

== Taxonomy and species list ==
The genus Hemithraupis was introduced in 1851 by the German ornithologist Jean Cabanis with the rufous-headed tanager as the type species. The genus name combines the Ancient Greek hēmi meaning "half" or "small" with thraupis, an unknown small bird. In ornithology thraupis is used to denote a tanager.

Genus Hemithraupis – Cabanis, 1851 – three species
Common name	Scientific name and subspecies	Range	Size and ecology	IUCN status and estimated population
Guira tanager Male Female	Hemithraupis guira (Linnaeus, 1766) Eight subspecies: H. g. nigrigula (Boddaert, 1783); H. g. roraimae (Hellmayr, 1910); H. g. guirina (Sclater, PL, 1856); H. g. huambina Stolzmann, 1926; H. g. boliviana Zimmer, JT, 1947; H. g. amazonica Zimmer, JT, 1947; H. g. guira (Linnaeus, 1766); H. g. fosteri (Sharpe, 1905)	Argentina, Bolivia, Brazil, Colombia, Ecuador, French Guiana, Guyana, Paraguay, Peru, Suriname, and Venezuela	Size: Habitat: Diet:	LC
Rufous-headed tanager Male Female	Hemithraupis ruficapilla (Vieillot, 1818)	Brazil	Size: Habitat: Diet:	LC
Yellow-backed tanager Male Female	Hemithraupis flavicollis (Vieillot, 1818) Eleven subspecies: H. f. flavicollis - (Vieillot, 1818); H. f. ornata - (Nelson, 1912); H. f. albigularis - (Sclater, 1855); H. f. peruana - (Bonaparte, 1851); H. f. aurigularis - (Cherrie, 1916); H. f. hellmayri - (Berlepsch, 1912); H. f. sororia - (Zimmer, 1947); H. f. centralis - (Hellmayr, 1907); H. f. obidensis - (Parkes, Humphrey, 1963); H. f. melanoxantha - (Lichtenstein, 1823); H. f. insignis - (Sclater, 1856)	Bolivia, Brazil, Colombia, Ecuador, French Guiana, Guyana, Peru, Suriname	Size: Habitat: Diet:	LC
