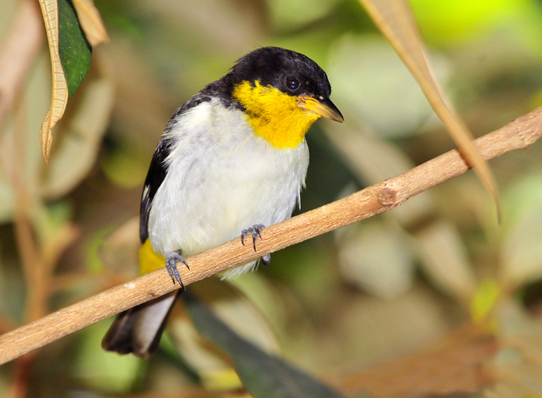
- Hemithraupis flavicollis insignis

Conservation status
- Least Concern (IUCN 3.1)

Scientific classification
- Kingdom: Animalia
- Phylum: Chordata
- Class: Aves
- Order: Passeriformes
- Family: Thraupidae
- Genus: Hemithraupis
- Species: H. flavicollis

Binomial name
- Hemithraupis flavicollis (Vieillot, 1818)

= Yellow-backed tanager =

Species of bird

The yellow-backed tanager (Hemithraupis flavicollis) is a species of bird in the family Thraupidae, the tanagers and allies. It is found in Panama and every mainland South American country except Argentina, Chile, Paraguay, and Uruguay.

== Taxonomy and systematics ==
The yellow-backed tanager was formally described in 1818 by Louis Pierre Vieillot with the binomial Nemosia flavicollis. By 1912 it had been reassigned to its current genus Hemithraupis. (Note: Subspecies ornata, described as Hemithraupis flavicollis ornata in 1912, was the earliest to be noted as belonging to H. flavicollis.) The genus name Hemithraupis combines the Ancient Greek words hēmi, meaning "half" or "small" and thraupis, which refers to an unidentified small bird mentioned by Aristotle. In ornithology, it is typically used to refer to tanagers. The specific epithet flavicollis is derived from Latin, meaning "yellow-necked".

The yellow-backed tanager has these 11 subspecies:

- H. f. flavicollis (Vieillot, 1818)
- H. f. ornata (Nelson, 1912)
- H. f. albigularis (Sclater, PL, 1855)
- H. f. peruana (Bonaparte, 1851)
- H. f. aurigularis (Cherrie, 1916)
- H. f. hellmayri (Berlepsch, 1912)
- H. f. sororia (Zimmer, JT, 1947)
- H. f. centralis (Hellmayr, 1907)
- H. f. obidensis (Parkes, Humphrey, 1963)
- H. f. melanoxantha (Lichtenstein, MHC, 1823)
- H. f. insignis (Sclater, 1856)

== Description ==
The yellow-backed tanager is about 13 cm (5.1 in) long and weighs 11 to 15 g (0.39 to 0.53 oz). It is a smallish tanager with a relatively slender bill. The species is sexually dimorphic. Adult males of the nominate subspecies H. f. flavicollis have a mostly brownish black head and upper back. Their lower back and rump are bright yellow. Their uppertail coverts are mostly bright yellow with the longest being brownish black. Their wings are mostly brownish black with a thin white band on the outer web of the outer primaries; the white shows as a small patch on the closed wing. Their tail is brownish black. Their throat and adjoining sides of the neck are bright yellow. Their underparts are mostly off-white with a gray tinge and sometimes some black mottling on the sides. Their undertail coverts are bright yellow. Adult females have an olive-green head and upperparts. Their upperwing coverts and flight feathers are darker with yellowish green edges. They have mostly yellow underparts; the color is brightest on the throat and breast and the flanks have an olive tinge. Both sexes of all subspecies have a dark brown iris, a dusky maxilla, a pinkish to yellow mandible, and dark gray legs and feet.

The other subspecies of the yellow-backed tanager differ from the nominate and each other thus:

- H. f. ornata: male is deeper yellow than nominate on rump, throat, and undertail coverts
- H. f. albigularis: male has white central throat, wide yellow malar stripe, and much black spotting on the sides of breast; female has grayish to whitish lower breast and belly
- H. f. peruana: male has short yellow line above the lores, a yellow arc under the eye, and yellow tips on median upperwing coverts that show as a small wing bar
- H. f. aurigularis: male has more black mottling than nominate
- H. f. hellmayri: male's yellow throat extends to central breast and it has dense black mottling on sides of breast
- H. f. sororia: male has paler yellow throat and more black mottling than nominate
- H. f. centralis: male has deeper black back and paler yellow throat than nominate with breast sides scalloped and barred with black
- H. f. obidensis: male has more brownish black upperparts and less intense yellow on rump, throat, and undertail coverts than nominate; female is more greenish overall than nominate
- H. f. melanoxantha: male like nominate; female brighter overall with more yellow on underparts than nominate
- H. f. insignis: male like nominate; female has browner upperparts than nominate

== Distribution and habitat ==
The yellow-backed tanager has a disjunct distribution. The subspecies are found thus:

- H. f. ornata: eastern Darién Province of Panama south into northwestern Colombia's Chocó Department
- H. f. albigularis: northern Colombia from the Sinú River in Córdoba Department east and south in the Magdalena River valley to Antioquia and Santander departments
- H. f. flavicollis Suriname, French Guiana, and Brazil north of the central Amazon River
- H. f. peruana: east of the Andes from Meta Department in central Colombia south through eastern Ecuador into northern Peru to the Marañón and Amazon rivers
- H. f. aurigularis: from southeastern Colombia east into southern Venezuela's Bolivar state in the Cuyuní River basin and northern Brazil's upper Uaupés and Negro river basins
- H. f. hellmayri: southeastern Venezuela's Bolívar and Amazonas states east into western Guyana
- H. f. sororia: northern and eastern Peru south of the Marañón
- H. f. centralis: southeastern Peru, northern and central Bolivia, and south-central Brazil east into northern Mato Grosso
- H. f. obidensis: north of the Amazon to the Atlantic in Brazil's Pará state
- H. f. melanoxantha: eastern Brazil from Pernambuco south to Bahia
- H. f. insignis: Espírito Santo and Rio de Janeiro states in southeastern Brazil

The yellow-backed tanager primarily inhabits terra firme forest, to a lesser extent várzea forest, and even less frequently forest edges, plantations, and clearings with trees. In elevation it ranges up to 1,000 m (3,300 ft) in Panama and Colombia and is mostly below 700 m (2,300 ft) in Ecuador. In Peru it is mostly below 750 m (2,500 ft) but locally reaches 1,350 m (4,400 ft). In Venezuela it reaches 550 m (1,800 ft) and in eastern Brazil is found on mountain slopes between 900 and 1,800 m (3,000 and 5,900 ft).

== Behavior ==
=== Movement ===
The yellow-backed tanager is a year-round resident.

=== Feeding ===
The yellow-backed tanager feeds on arthropods and fruit. It forages in pairs and family groups and almost always as members of a mixed-species feeding flock. It forages mostly in the forest canopy by gleaning while perched and less frequently by hover-gleaning or with a short sally.

=== Breeding ===
The yellow-backed tanager's breeding season has not been defined but activity has been noted in January, April to June, and September in Colombia. Nothing else is known about the species' breeding biology.

=== Vocalization ===
While foraging the yellow-backed tanager makes "a high tsick and tut and tyoo tsick" calls. In Peru its calls are "a rich chew and a higher tsew and seew". In Brazil what might be either a song or call is a "single or series of nasal, upslurred sreeeh notes".

== Status ==
The IUCN has assessed the yellow-backed tanager as being of Least Concern. It has an extremely large range; its estimated population of at least five million mature individuals is believed to be decreasing. No immediate threats have been identified. It is considered "fairly common" in Colombia and Venezuela, "uncommon but widely distributed" in Peru, and "frequent to uncommon" in Brazil. It "[o]ccurs in many protected areas, and vast areas of appropriate habitat lie in unprotected areas within its range". However, the subspecies "inhabiting Panama–NW Colombia region (races ornatus and albigularis) and SE Brazil coastal corridor (melanoxantha and insignis) live in areas that are heavily deforested, and relatively little habitat in these regions has any kind of protected status".
