= Guira =

Guira may refer to:

- Guira cuckoo (Guira guira)
- Guira tanager (Hemithraupis guira)
- Güira, musical instrument
