= Humphrey–Parkes terminology =

System of nomenclature for the plumage of birds

Humphrey–Parkes terminology is an American system of nomenclature for the plumages and molts of birds that emphasizes evolutionary homology as the basis for naming individual plumages and molts throughout the life cycle, as opposed to the season or part of the annual cycle during which these plumages and molts appear. The original system was developed by Philip Strong Humphrey and Kenneth Carroll Parkes in a pair of papers in 1959 and 1963. Over the subsequent decades, the homology-based system has gained some acceptance among professional North American and, to some extent, Australian ornithologists, and consequently became the system used for naming plumages and molts in some reference texts on birds from the New World. In Europe, the terminology is disliked and its adoption has been negligible; the traditional annual cycle-based system continues to be near-universally used. In a review of usage and perceptions, the terminology was criticised for its complex and counterintuitive nomenclature; acceptance and understanding the terms among general birders (as opposed to professional ornithologists) was found to be significantly lower than for traditional systems even in North America, and very low in Europe.

In 2003, the American ornithologist Steve Howell proposed a substantial revision to the Humphrey-Parkes system, clarifying the treatment of molts during the first year of a bird's life. This revision has been controversial, with many authors enthusiastically adopting the revision while some have defended the validity of the original Humphrey-Parkes system.

== Description of original Humphrey-Parkes system ==
Under the Humphrey–Parkes nomenclature, the main adult plumage, especially when it is produced by a complete molt, is called basic plumage. In most birds, the non-breeding plumage, which is worn longer than the breeding plumage, is known as the basic plumage. In birds that molt only once a year, the regular and only plumage is known as basic plumage.

In some birds, a partial molt occurs before the bird breeds. This plumage is known as the alternate plumage and is generally what was previously known as a bird's breeding plumage. If a bird produces a third plumage in addition to the basic and alternate, it is known as supplemental plumage. This plumage is most frequently found in ptarmigan. The unique plumage of a juvenile bird is sometimes spelled as "juvenal" plumage in the United States (though more often and simply, juvenile plumage, avoiding confusion with the Roman poet).

When the bird is molting, the molt is known as a prejuvenile, prebasic, prealternate, or presupplemental molt, depending on which type follows the molt.

For birds that do not completely molt into full adult plumage the first time, a numbering system is used to signify which plumage it is in. For example, for the first time a bird enters basic plumage, the plumage is known as first basic plumage; the second, second basic plumage. The numbers are dropped after a bird achieves its full adult plumage.
