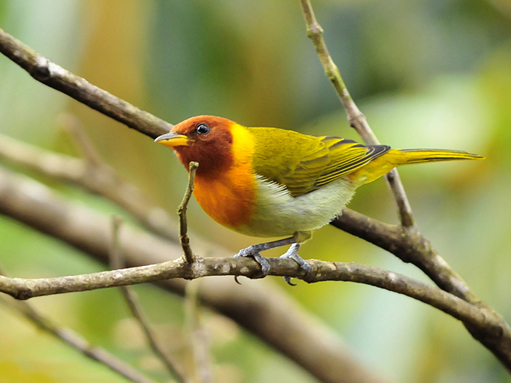

Conservation status
- Least Concern (IUCN 3.1)

Scientific classification
- Kingdom: Animalia
- Phylum: Chordata
- Class: Aves
- Order: Passeriformes
- Family: Thraupidae
- Genus: Hemithraupis
- Species: H. ruficapilla

Binomial name
- Hemithraupis ruficapilla (Vieillot, 1818)

= Rufous-headed tanager =

Species of bird

The rufous-headed tanager (Hemithraupis ruficapilla) is a species of bird in the family Thraupidae, the tanagers and allies. It is endemic to Brazil.

== Taxonomy and systematics ==
The rufous-headed tanager was formally described in 1818 with the binomial Nemosia ruficapilla. It was eventually reassigned to its present genus Hemithraupis that the German ornithologist Jean Cabanis erected in 1851. The rufous-headed tanager and the guira tanager (H. guira) hybrize where their ranges overlap; they are sister species and form a superspecies.

The rufous-headed tanager has two subspecies, the nominate H. r. ruficapilla (Vieillot, 1818) and H. r. bahiae (Zimmer, JT, 1947). They are very similar and some authors suggest that they be lumped.

== Description ==
The rufous-headed tanager is about 13 cm (5.1 in) long and weighs 11 to 13 g (0.39 to 0.46 oz). The species is sexually dimorphic. Adult males of the nominate subspecies have a mostly rich reddish chestnut head with a large bright yellow crescent behind the ear coverts. Their nape and back are olive with a yellowish tinge and their rump dark orange-rufous. Their uppertail coverts are mostly yellowish with the longest being yellowish olive. The inner webs of their upperwing coverts are dusky and the outer webs yellowish olive and their flight feathers are dusky with wide olive-yellow edges. Their tail is dusky with wide yellow-olive tips and edges. Their upper breast is orange-rufous, their lower breast and belly pale yellow, their sides and flanks olive-gray, and their undertail coverts a paler yellow than the belly. Adult females have an olive-green head with a faint short yellowish supercilium and a thin yellow eye-ring. Their upperparts are also mostly olive-green with a yellowish rump. Their underparts are mostly yellow with a gray tinge on the flanks. Subspecies H. r. bahiae has longer wings and tail than the nominate. Males have a paler chestnut crown and usually a paler breast than the nominate. Females are like the nominate. Both sexes of both subspecies have a dark brown iris, a blackish brown maxilla with a paler base, a mostly yellowish mandible, and dark gray legs and feet.

== Distribution and habitat ==
The rufous-headed tanager is found only in southeastern Brazil. Subspecies H. r. bahiae is the more northerly of the two. It is found in southeastern Bahia. The nominate subspecies is found from southern Minas Gerais and Espírito Santo south to northeastern Rio Grande do Sul. It is a bird of the Atlantic Forest. There it inhabits somewhat open landscapes including light woodlands, the edges of larger forest, secondary forest, plantations, and parks with a good number of trees. Sources differ on its elevational range. One says it is from sea level to 1,500 m (4,900 ft) and another says it reaches only 1,100 m (3,600 ft).

== Behavior ==
=== Movement ===
The rufous-headed tanager is a year-round resident.

=== Feeding ===
The rufous-headed tanager feeds mostly on small arthropods but also includes small amounts of fruit in its diet. It forages in pairs and families, often as members of a mixed-species feeding flock. It is an active, restless forager that usually feeds in the forest's upper levels.

=== Breeding ===
The rufous-headed tanager's breeding season includes October but nothing else is known about the species breeding biology.

=== Vocalization ===
The rufous-headed tanager's song is a "very high, level, hurried series of sisi---- notes, slowing down slightly at the end". Its call is a "very high, dry zip".

== Status ==
The IUCN has assessed the rufous-headed tanager as being of Least Concern. Its population size is not known and is believed to be decreasing. No immediate threats have been identified. It is considered "common to frequent". It occurs in many national parks and other reserves. "Outside these and other protected areas deforestation is widespread, and little suitable habitat remains." However, though it can survive in forest remnants as small as about 250 ha (1 sq mi), "Brazil’s scattered reserves and protected areas appear critical as reservoirs for its long-term survival".
