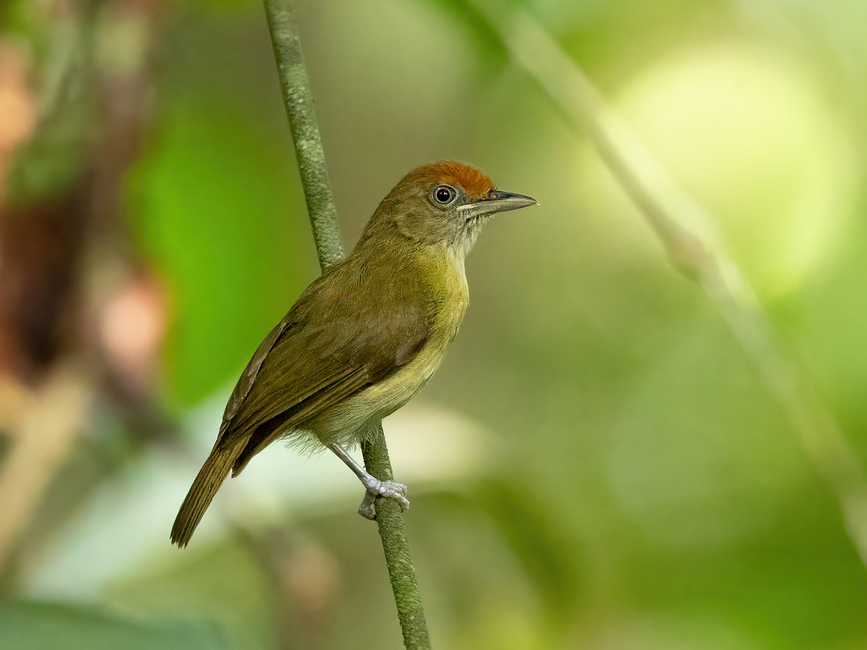

Scientific classification
- Kingdom: Animalia
- Phylum: Chordata
- Class: Aves
- Order: Passeriformes
- Family: Vireonidae
- Genus: Tunchiornis
- Species: T. ferrugineifrons

Binomial name
- Tunchiornis ferrugineifrons (Sclater, 1862)

= Rufous-fronted brownlet =

Species of bird

The rufous-fronted brownlet or rufous-fronted greenlet (Tunchiornis ferrugineifrons) is a passerine bird in the family Vireonidae, the vireos, greenlets, and shrike-babblers. It is found in Bolivia, Brazil, Colombia, Ecuador, Peru, and Venezuela.

== Taxonomy and systematics ==
The rufous-fronted brownlet was formally described in 1862 by the English zoologist Philip Sclater as Hylophilus ferrugineifrons from a holotype collected in Bogota, Colombia. It was subsequently reassigned as a subspecies of what was then the tawny-crowned brownlet (Pachysylvia ochraceiceps ). By the end of the twentieth century the tawny-crowned brownlet had been reassigned to genus Hylophilus. The new genus Tunchiornis was erected for the species in 2014.

Based on a study published in 2021, in 2025 the Clements Checklist split the tawny-crowned brownlet into the rufous-fronted brownlet and three other species. AviList also adopted the split in its initial 2025 version. The IOC and the South American Classification Committee (SACC) followed suit in 2026.

The rufous-fronted brownlet's further taxonomy is unsettled. BirdLife International's Handbook of the Birds of the World (HBW) did not adopt the four-way split but retained ferrugineifrons as a subspecies of T. ochraceiceps. It also uses the name "rufous-fronted brownlet" for T. rubrifrons, which the other systems call the Para brownlet. And in July 2026 the South American Classification Committee renamed all members of Tunchiornis "brownlet". They made the change because the genus Tunchiornis is not closely related to the other genera of greenlets and because its species are more brown than green. (Note: The SACC adopted the split in February 2026 and between then and July called T. ferrugineifrons the "western tawny-crowned greenlet". At the same time that they adopted "brownlet" they deleted "tawny-crowned" and adopted the other systems' prefix of "rufous-fronted" for the species.)

The IOC, AviList, and Clements recognize two subspecies of rufous-fronted greenlet, the nominate T. f. ferrugineifrons (Sclater, PL, 1862) and T. f. viridior (Todd, WEC, 1929).

== Description ==
The ochre-crowned brownlet is 12 cm (4.7 in) long and weighs 9 to 14 g (0.32 to 0.49 oz). The sexes have the same plumage. Adults of the nominate subspecies T. o. ochraceiceps have a rufous forehead and crown. Their face is mostly whitish with an olivaceous wash. Their upperparts and wings are brownish olive and their tail more brown. Their throat is whitish and their underparts whitish with a strong olivaceous wash. Subspecies T. f. viridior has a slightly lighter rufous crown and a greener back and tail than the nominate. Both subspecies have a pale iris, a black maxilla, a paler gray mandible, and pinkish to grayish legs and feet.

== Distribution and habitat ==
The nominate subspecies of the rufous-fronted brownlet has the larger and more northerly range of the two. It is found from the southeastern quadrant of Colombia south through eastern Ecuador into northeastern Peru. From that line its range continues east through southern Venezuela's Amazonas and southern Bolívar states and northwestern Brazil's Acre and Amazonas states. In Brazil its range extends to the Negro River north of the Amazon and to the Madeira River south of it. Some sources extend its range slightly into far western Guyana but the SACC has no records in that country. Subspecies T. f. viridior is found from San Martín Department in northern Peru south into Bolivia to northern Santa Cruz Department.

The rufous-fronted brownlet primarily inhabits the undergrowth of intact terra firme forest. In elevation it ranges up to 800 m (2,600 ft) in Colombia, to 700 m (2,300 ft) in Ecuador, to 1,200 m (3,900 ft) in Peru, to 1,600 m (5,200 ft) in Venezuela, and to 800 m (2,600 ft) in Brazil.

== Behavior ==
=== Movement ===
The rufous-fronted brownlet is a year-round resident.

=== Feeding ===
The rufous-fronted brownlet's diet has not been studied but is known to include insects, spiders, and smaller amounts of fruit. It typically forages as a member of a mixed-species feeding flock and takes most prey by gleaning from leaves.

=== Breeding ===
The rufous-fronted brownlet's breeding season has not been fully defined but spans at least late August to early October in southern Peru. Three nests were open cups made mostly from moss lined with seed fluff and thin grass. They were in shrubs between 0.8 and 2.0 m (3 and 7 ft) above the ground. The only known clutches were of one or two eggs that were creamy white with dark brown spots. The incubation period is about 14 days and fledging occurs about 11 days after hatch. Both parents provision nestlings.

=== Vocalization ===
The rufous-fronted brownlet's song is a "pure whistle that is steadily repeated many times at intervals of a few seconds" and that usually descends in pitch. Its call is a "short stereotypic chattered series of rapidly repeated rising nasal notes: nyaa-nya-nya-nya, typically uttered several times at irregular intervals".

== Status ==
The IUCN follows HBW taxonomy and so has not separately assessed the rufous-fronted brownlet from the combined ochre-crowned and rufous-fronted brownlets. The rufous-fronted brownlet is considered "uncommon" in Colombia, "widespread and locally fairly common" in Peru, "fairly common" in Venezuela, and "frequent to uncommon" in Brazil. "Information [is] needed, but it seems likely that large blocks of undisturbed forest are essential to its long-term survival."
