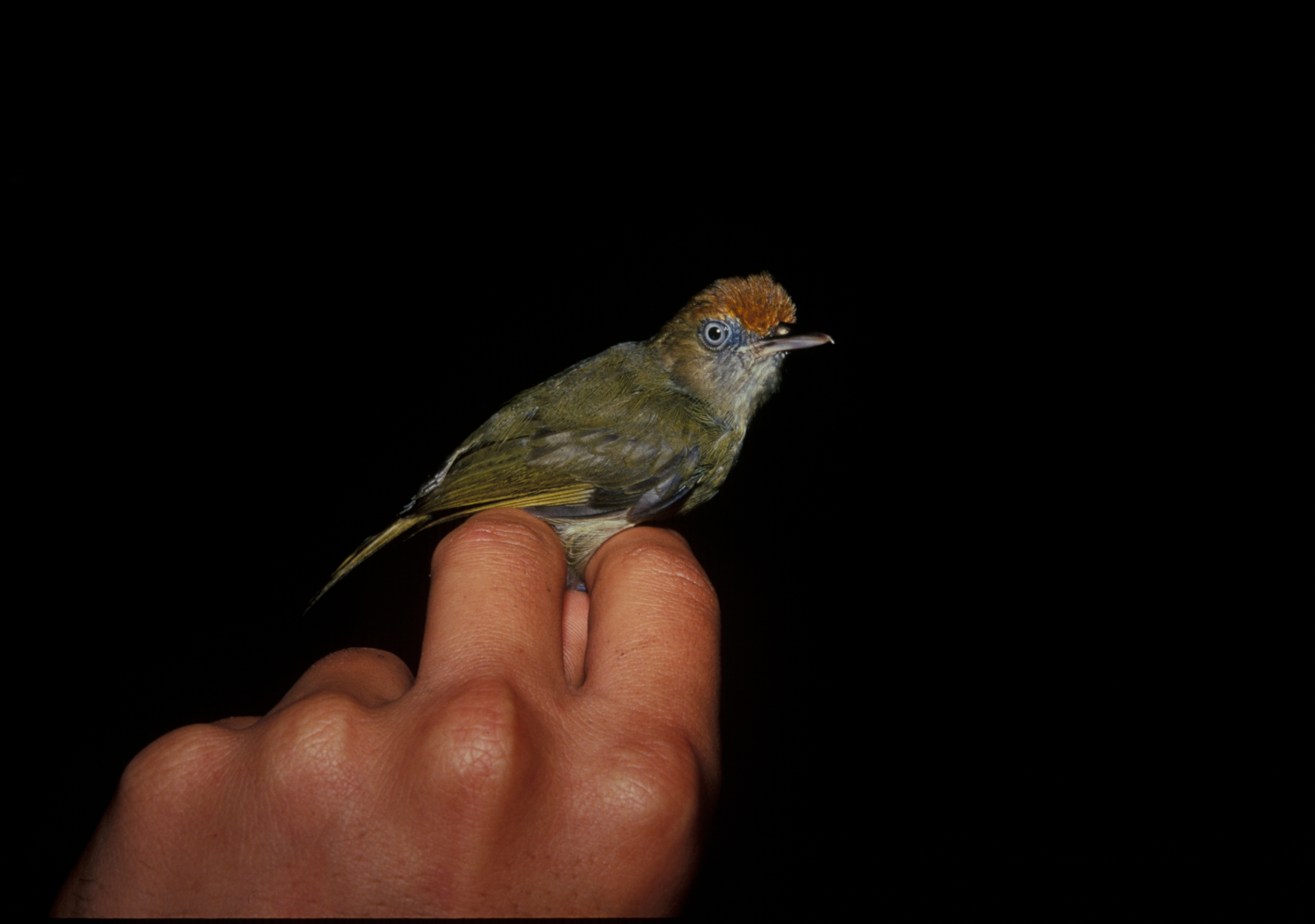
- Ochre-crowned greenlet (Tunchiornis ochraceiceps)

Scientific classification
- Kingdom: Animalia
- Phylum: Chordata
- Class: Aves
- Order: Passeriformes
- Family: Vireonidae
- Genus: Tunchiornis; Slager & Klicka, 2014

Type species
- Hylophilus ochraceiceps Sclater, PL, 1860

= Tunchiornis =

Genus of birds

Tunchiornis is a genus of birds in the family Vireonidae, the vireos, greenlets, and shrike-babblers. Its members are found in Central and South America.

== Taxonomy ==
The genus Tunchiornis was introduced in 2014 by David Slager and John Klicka with Hylophilus ochraceiceps Sclater, PL, 1860, the ochre-crowned greenlet, as the type species. The genus name combines El Tunche from Peruvian mythology, the whistling guardian spirit of the forest, with Ancient Greek ορνις/ornis, ορνιθος /ornithos meaning "bird".

The genus' further taxonomy is unsettled. The IOC, AviList, the Clements taxonomy, and the South American Classification Committee (SACC) recognize these four species:

Image	Common name	Scientific name	Distribution
	Ochre-crowned brownlet	Tunchiornis ochraceiceps	Mexico, Central America, western Colombia.
	Rufous-fronted brownlet	Tunchiornis ferrugineifrons	Western Amazonia.
	Guianan brownlet	Tunchiornis luteifrons	Guiana shield.
	Para brownlet	Tunchiornis rubrifrons	Pará, Brazil.

However, BirdLife International's Handbook of the Birds of the World (HBW) does not recognize T. ferrugineifrons as a species but includes it as a subspecies of T. ochraceiceps. Confusingly, it calls T. ochraceiceps by its old name "tawny-crowned greenlet" and calls T. rubrifrons the "rufous-fronted greenlet", which the other systems use for T. ferrugineifrons. It also calls T. luteifrons the "olive-crowned greenlet". And in July 2026 the SACC renamed all members of Tunchiornis "brownlet". They made the change because the genus Tunchiornis is not closely related to the other genera of greenlets and because its species are more brown than green. (Note: The SACC adopted the split in February 2026 and between then and July called the four species the "northern", "western", "Guianan", and "Para" tawny-crowned greenlets. At the same time that they adopted "brownlet" they deleted "tawny-crowned" from the names and adopted the other systems' prefixes of "ochre-crowned" and "rufous-fronted" for the first two species.)
