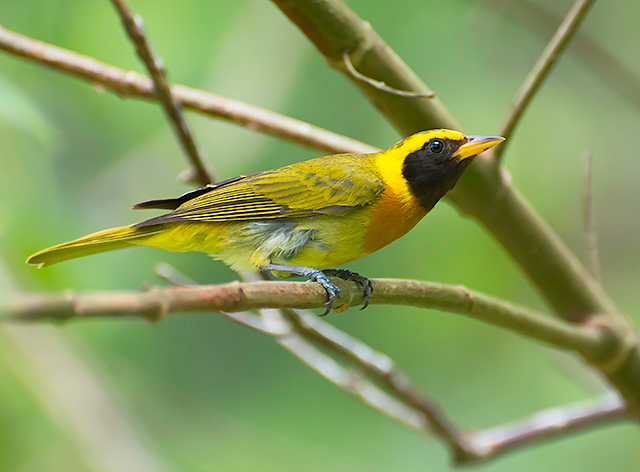

Conservation status
- Least Concern (IUCN 3.1)

Scientific classification
- Kingdom: Animalia
- Phylum: Chordata
- Class: Aves
- Order: Passeriformes
- Family: Thraupidae
- Genus: Hemithraupis
- Species: H. guira

Binomial name
- Hemithraupis guira (Linnaeus, 1766)

Synonyms
- Motacilla guira (protonym)

= Guira tanager =

Species of bird

The guira tanager (Hemithraupis guira) is a species of bird in the family Thraupidae, the tanagers and allies. It is found in every mainland South American country except Chile and Uruguay.

== Taxonomy and systematics ==
The guira tanager was formally described in 1766 by the Swedish naturalist Carl Linnaeus in the twelfth edition of his Systema Naturae with the binomial Motacilla guira. Linnaeus based his description on the "Guira-guaça beraba" that had been described by the German naturalist Georg Marcgrave in 1648 in his Historia Naturalis Brasiliae. The specific epithet guira is a Guaraní word meaning "bird". The type locality is the state of Pernambuco in eastern Brazil. In 1851 by the German ornithologist Jean Cabanis erected the genus Hemithraupis and assigned the guira tanager to it.

The guira tanager and the rufous-headed tanager (H. ruficapilla) hybrize where their ranges overlap; they are sister species and form a superspecies.

The guira tanager has these eight subspecies:

- H. g. nigrigula (Boddaert, 1783)
- H. g. roraimae (Hellmayr, 1910)
- H. g. guirina (Sclater, PL, 1856)
- H. g. huambina Stolzmann, 1926
- H. g. boliviana Zimmer, JT, 1947
- H. g. amazonica Zimmer, JT, 1947
- H. g. guira (Linnaeus, 1766)
- H. g. fosteri (Sharpe, 1905)

== Description ==
The guira tanager is 13 to 14 cm (5.1 to 5.5 in) long and weighs 9.5 to 14 g (0.34 to 0.49 oz). The species is sexually dimorphic. Adult males of the nominate subspecies H. g. guira have a yellowish olive-green forecrown, crown, back, and tail. Much of their face and their throat are black, separated from the olive-green by a yellow supercilium that continues down around the back of the black face. Their rump is reddish orange to burnt orange that becomes yellow on the uppertail coverts. Their wing coverts and flight feathers are dusky with olive edges. Their breast is rufous orange or burnt orange, their belly greenish, their flanks ashy, and their undertail coverts yellowish. Adult females have an olive-green head and upperparts; the color is yellower on the uppertail coverts. Their underparts are mostly pale yellow or yellowish green with gray flanks and usually a grayish white belly. Both sexes of all subspecies have a dark brown iris, a horn-black maxilla, a dark yellow mandible, and leaden gray legs and feet. Immature males have a brown back and a paler mask and less intense orange on the rump and breast than adults.

The other subspecies of the guira tanager differ from the nominate and each other thus:

- H. g. nigrigula: male's throat is dark brown and facial yellow is wider than nominate's and extends to under most of the throat
- H. g. roraimae: male's throat and facial yellow like nigrigula; female has darker olive upperparts and brighter yellow underparts than nominate
- H. g. guirina: larger than nominate; male with darker, less yellowish upperparts, a thinner yellow facial streak with strong raw sienna tinge, and darker breast
- H. g. huambina: much like nominate
- H. g. boliviana: larger than nominate; male with lighter green back and darker brown breast
- H. g. amazonica: male has darker olive back, wider yellow facial stripe, and deeper brownish breast and rump than nominate
- H. g. fosteri: larger than nominate; male with larger yellow facial stripe that begins across the forehead

== Distribution and habitat ==
The guira tanager has a disjunct distribution. The subspecies are found thus:

- H. g. guirina: Colombia's Cauca and Magdalena river valleys and Eastern Andes south to Huila and Caquetá departments; western Ecuador from southern Esmeraldas Province south to Guayas Province; extreme northwestern Peru's Tumbes Department
- H. g. nigrigula: locally across northern Venezuela except southeastern Bolívar state and east through the Guianas and northeastern Brazil north of the Amazon River
- H. g. huambina: from southern Colombia's Nariño Department south through eastern Ecuador and eastern Peru and east in western Brazil south of the Amazon to the Madeira River
- H. g. roraimae: region of Cerro Roraima in southeastern Venezuela and west-central Guyana
- H. g. boliviana: eastern Bolivia, northwestern Argentina south to at least Tucumán Province, and probably central Brazil's Mato Grosso
- H. g. amazonica: central Brazil south of the Amazon between the Madeira and Tapajós rivers
- H. g. guira: east-central Brazil south of the Amazon from the Tocantins River east to the Atlantic in Ceará and south to Goiás and northwestern Bahia; extreme eastern Brazil in Paraíba, Pernambuco, and Alagoas
- H. g. fosteri: eastern Paraguay east and south across northeastern Argentina's Misiones Province and southern Brazil to a line from the interior of Minas Gerais south to the interior of Rio Grande do Sul

The guira tanager primarily inhabits tropical evergreen forest in the lowlands. It also occurs in dryer to moist forest, secondary forest, woodlands, coffee and cacao plantations, and clearings with trees. It inhabits coastal mangroves in extreme northwestern Peru. In elevation it ranges up to 1,500 m (4,900 ft) in Colombia, to 1,100 m (3,600 ft) in Ecuador, locally to 1,500 m (4,900 ft) in Peru, to 1,450 m (4,800 ft) in Venezuela, and mostly to 1,500 m (4,900 ft) but locally higher in Brazil.

== Behavior ==
=== Movement ===
The guira tanager is a year-round resident.

=== Feeding ===
The guira tanager feeds on arthropods such as insects and spiders and on fruit such as Miconia berries. It forages in the forest canopy in pairs and family groups, almost always as members of a mixed-species feeding flock. It takes most arthropod prey by gleaning from foliage.

=== Breeding ===
The guira tanager's breeding season has not been defined. It apparently includes July in Suriname and does include October and November in Paraguay. The one known nest was a flimsy cup made from palm fibers and lichen with a lining of finer fibers. It was in a branch fork high in a tree and held two eggs that were white with light cinnamon markings. There is one known case of brood parasitism by a shiny cowbird (Molothrus bonariensis). Nothing else is known about the species' breeding biology.

=== Vocalization ===
The guira tanager's dawn song is a "TIT-de-de DIT TIT TIT, tit-de-de-dit dit" whose last note is sometimes a squeal. One day song is "a rapid series of nasal chees or chuts [that] accelerate into a trill of chits, then slows at the end". Another day song is "6-7 sharp, incisive notes, sa-sit-sit-sit-sit-sit-sit (rather weak)". Its flight call is tsip-tsip and other calls include aauck, chit, and jewt.

== Status ==
The IUCN has assessed the guira tanager as being of Least Concern. It has an extremely large range; its population size is not known and is believed to be decreasing. No immediate threats have been identified. It is considered common in Colombia and Ecuador, "fairly common locally" in Venezuela, and "frequent to uncommon" in Brazil. It is "typically uncommon [but] apparently more common in northern Peru than in southern".
