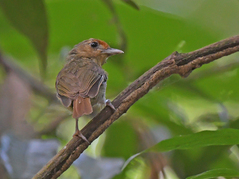

Conservation status
- Least Concern (IUCN 3.1)

Scientific classification
- Kingdom: Animalia
- Phylum: Chordata
- Class: Aves
- Order: Passeriformes
- Family: Vireonidae
- Genus: Tunchiornis
- Species: T. rubrifrons

Binomial name
- Tunchiornis rubrifrons (Sclater & Salvin, 1867)

= Para brownlet =

Species of bird

The Para brownlet or Para greenlet (Tunchiornis rubrifrons) is a passerine bird in the family Vireonidae, the vireos, brownlets, and shrike-babblers. It is endemic to Brazil.

== Taxonomy and systematics ==
The Para brownlet was formally described in 1867 by the English ornithologists Philip Sclater and Osbert Salvin as Hylophilus rubrifrons. It was subsequently reassigned as a subspecies of what was then the tawny-crowned brownlet (Pachysylvia ochraceiceps ). By the end of the twentieth century the tawny-crowned brownlet had been reassigned to genus Hylophilus. The new genus Tunchiornis was erected for the species in 2014.

Based on a study published in 2021, in 2022 BirdLife International's Handbook of the Birds of the World (HBW) recognized T. rubrifrons as a full species. HBW named it the "rufous-fronted greenlet", a name later used by most other taxonomic systems for T. ferrugineifrons. In 2025 the Clements Checklist recognized the split and AviList also adopted it in its initial 2025 version, both using the English name "Para greenlet". The IOC and the South American Classification Committee (SACC) followed suit in 2026.

In July 2026 the SACC renamed all members of Tunchiornis "brownlet". They made the change because the genus Tunchiornis is not closely related to the other genera of greenlets and because its species are more brown than green. (Note: The SACC adopted the split in February 2026 and between then and July called T. rubrifrons the "Para tawny-crowned greenlet". At the same time that they adopted "brownlet" they deleted "tawny-crowned" from the name.)

The Para brownlet has two subspecies, the nominate T. r. rubrifrons (Sclater, PL & Salvin, O, 1867) and T. r. lutescens (Snethlage, E, 1914).

== Description ==
The Para brownlet is 12 cm (4.7 in) long. The sexes have the same plumage. Adults of the nominate subspecies have a pale russet-brown to tawny forehead and an olive-brown crown. Their upperparts and wings are olive-brown and their tail brown. Their underparts are pale buff to buffy yellow that is lightest on the throat. Subspecies T. r. lutescens has more greenish upperparts and more yellowish underparts than the nominate. Both subspecies have a dark iris, a gray to pinkish bill with a paler mandible, and pinkish to grayish legs and feet.

== Distribution and habitat ==
The Para brownlet is found south of the Amazon River in north-central Brazil. Subspecies T. r. lutescens is the more westerly of the two. It is found from the Rio Madeira east to the Rio Tapajós and south as far as west-central Mato Grosso. The nominate is found from the Tapajós east to the Atlantic in eastern Pará and far northern Maranhão and south to north-central Mato Grosso. The species primarily inhabits the undergrowth of untouched terra firme forest, where it often favors openings caused by fallen trees. In elevation it ranges from sea level to 800 m (2,600 ft).

== Behavior ==
=== Movement ===
The Para brownlet is almost surely a sedentary year-round resident.

=== Feeding ===
The Para brownlet's diet and foraging behavior have not been studied but are assumed to be similar to those of other species in its genus, for example see here.

=== Breeding ===
Nothing is known about the Para brownlet's breeding biology.

=== Vocalization ===
The two subspecies of the Para brownlet have different songs. That of the nominate is a "pure whistle that is steadily repeated many times at intervals of a few seconds". That of T. r. lutescens is a "steadily repeated phrase of three whistles, the first one short, the second one lower-pitched and longer, and the last one even lower, e.g. ti-teee-yeee or ti-teee-eeuw". Its calls are not well known but have been described as "short stutters or bursts of short overslurred notes".

== Status ==
The IUCN has assessed the Para brownlet as being of Least Concern. It has a large range; its population size is not known and is believed to be decreasing. "The species is threatened by the loss and fragmentation of its habitat for agricultural conversion." It is considered "frequent to uncommon" in Brazil. The species is "highly susceptible to forest fragmentation, which is an increasingly severe problem in much of its range...large blocks of primary forest are likely essential for the survival of this species".
