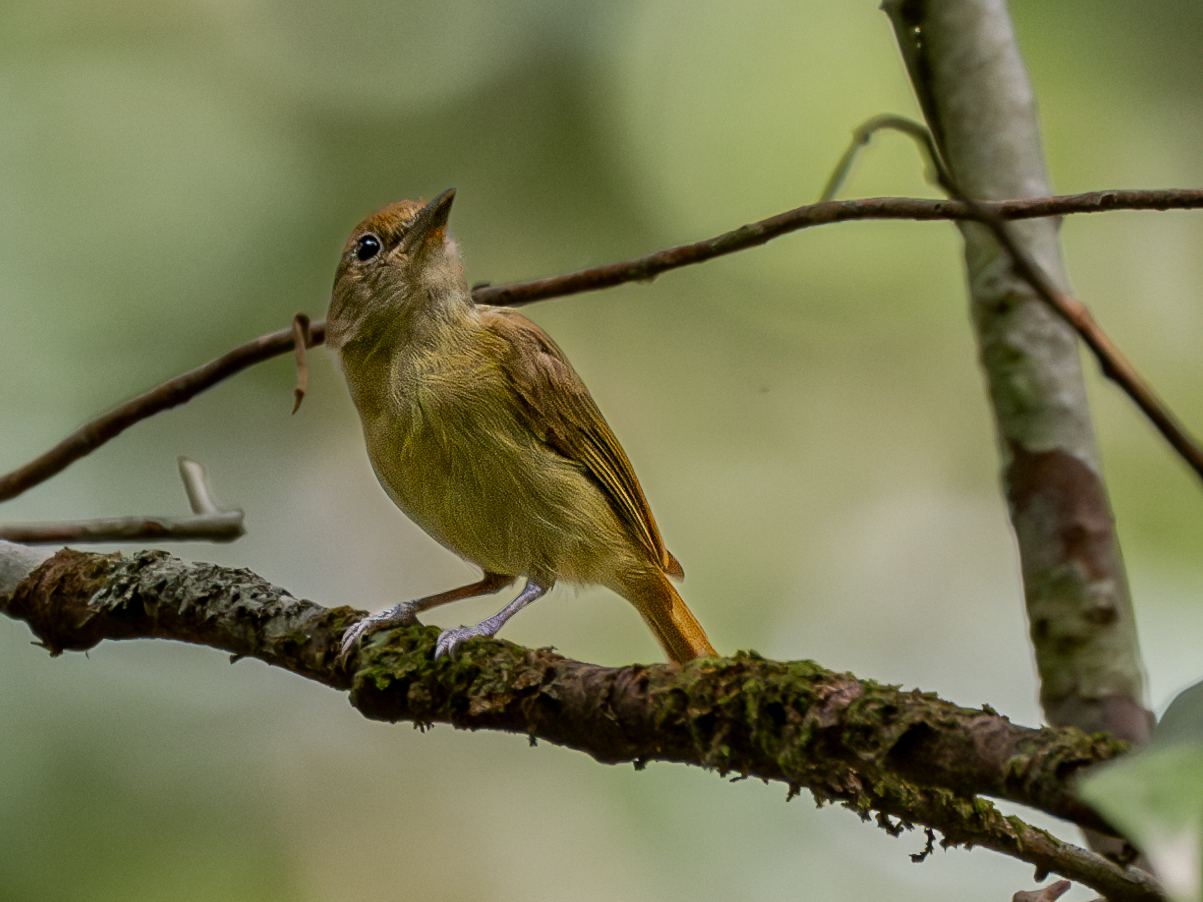

Conservation status
- Least Concern (IUCN 3.1)

Scientific classification
- Kingdom: Animalia
- Phylum: Chordata
- Class: Aves
- Order: Passeriformes
- Family: Vireonidae
- Genus: Tunchiornis
- Species: T. luteifrons

Binomial name
- Tunchiornis luteifrons (Sclater, PL, 1881)

= Guianan brownlet =

Species of bird

The Guianan brownlet or Guianan greenlet (Tunchiornis luteifrons), also known as the olive-crowned greenlet, is a passerine bird in the family Vireonidae, the vireos, brownlets, and shrike-babblers. It is found in Brazil, French Guiana, Guyana, Suriname, and Venezuela.

== Taxonomy and systematics ==
The Guianan brownlet was formally described in 1881 by the English zoologist Philip Sclater as Hylophilus luteifrons from a specimen collected in British Guiana (now Guyana). It was subsequently reassigned as a subspecies of what was then the tawny-crowned brownlet (Pachysylvia ochraceiceps ). By the end of the twentieth century the tawny-crowned brownlet had been reassigned to genus Hylophilus. The new genus Tunchiornis was erected for the species in 2014.

Based on a study published in 2021, in 2022 BirdLife International's Handbook of the Birds of the World (HBW) recognized T. luteifrons as a full species but called it the "olive-crowned greenlet". In 2025 the Clements Checklist recognized the split and AviList also adopted it in its initial 2025 version. The IOC and the South American Classification Committee (SACC) followed suit in 2026.

In July 2026 the SACC renamed all members of Tunchiornis "brownlet". They made the change because the genus Tunchiornis is not closely related to the other genera of greenlets and because its species are more brown than green. (Note: The SACC adopted the split in February 2026 and between then and July called T. luteifrons the "Guianan tawny-crowned greenlet". At the same time that they adopted "brownlet" they deleted "tawny-crowned" from the name.)

The Guianan brownlet is monotypic.

== Description ==
The Guianan brownlet is 12 cm (4.7 in) long and weighs about 9.4 to 11 g (0.33 to 0.39 oz). The sexes have the same plumage. Adults have a buffy yellow forehead and loral area. Their face is mostly whitish with an olivaceous wash. Their upperparts, wings, and tail are brownish with orange-yellow edges on the flight feathers. Their throat is whitish and their underparts mostly yellowish with a buffy wash on the breast and greenish yellow flanks and undertail coverts. They have a dark brown iris, a black or dark gray maxilla, a pale gray mandible, and grayish legs and feet.

== Distribution and habitat ==
The Guianan brownlet is a bird of the Guiana Shield. It is found from eastern Bolívar state in Venezuela east through the Guianas and northern Brazil north of the Amazon River and east of the Branco and Negro rivers to the Atlantic in Pará state. It primarily inhabits the understory of humid tropical forest, where it favors openings caused by fallen trees. In Guyana it also occurs locally in várzea forest. In elevation it is mostly found below 850 m (2,800 ft).

== Behavior ==
=== Movement ===
The Guianan brownlet is almost certainly a sedentary year-round resident.

=== Feeding ===
The Guianan brownlet's diet has not been studied but is known to include a wide variety of insects. It typically forages in dense vegetation in the forest's mid-story and as a member of a mixed-species feeding flock. It takes most prey by gleaning from the tips of leaves.

=== Breeding ===
The Guianan brownlet's breeding activity appears to be concentrated between July and November. Its nest and eggs have not been described and its incubation period, time to fledging, and details of parental care are not known.

=== Vocalization ===
The Guianan brownlet's song is a "steadily repeated ventriloquial, penetrating phrase of two slightly descending pure whistles, the second one lower-pitched and longer than the first one, e.g. teee-yeee or teee-eeuw".

== Status ==
The IUCN has assessed the Guianan brownlet as being of least concern. It has a large range; its population size is not known and is believed to be decreasing. "The species is threatened by the loss and fragmentation of its habitat for small-scale agricultural conversion." It is considered "frequent to uncommon" in Brazil. "All data so far point to extreme sensitivity of the Guianan Greenlet to forest fragmentation ... so maintenance of large blocks of intact forest is likely essential to its long-term survival."
