= Kenneth Carroll Parkes =

American ornithologist

Kenneth Carroll Parkes (8 August 1922 – 16 July 2007) was an American ornithologist. He worked as a curator at the Carnegie Museum of Natural History and was involved in studies on birds both in the field and museum, the standardization of North American bird names in English, and on the terminology used to describe molt.

Parkes was born in Hackensack, New Jersey and studied in New York City. He went to the Lincoln School of Teachers' College, New York. An interest in the bird art of Louis Agassiz Fuertes and trips to the zoo made him interested in animals and birds from an early age. He obtained his bachelor's (1943) and masters' (1948) degrees from Cornell University followed by a PhD (1952) studying under Arthur A. Allen. He worked at the Carnegie Museum of Natural History, Pittsburgh, Pennsylvania as an assistant curator of birds from 1953 and became a chief curator in 1975. In 1956 he went on a collection expedition to the Philippines and in 1961 to Argentina. Parkes described numerous bird species and worked on a committee to standardize the English names of birds. He was also involved in a landmark paper that clarified the terminologies used in describing the molts and plumages of birds (Humphrey–Parkes terminology).

He was also involved in the production of the humorous journal, the Auklet, which he edited and also contributed to. A compilation of its issues was published in 1983 as The Antic Alcid. He died after a long illness with complications from Parkinson's disease.
