= Philip Strong Humphrey =

American ornithologist (1926–2009)

Philip Strong Humphrey (26 February 1926, Hibbing, Minnesota – 13 November 2009, Lawrence, Kansas) was an ornithologist, museum curator, and professor of zoology.

== Biography ==
Philip S. Humphrey grew up in Litchfield, Connecticut and from an early age was interested in birds. In Litchfield, Duryea Morton (1924–2019) was a childhood friend who encouraged Humphrey's ornithological interests. After graduating from Litchfield's Forman School, Humphrey matriculated at Amherst College and graduated there in 1949 after serving in the U.S. Army Air Forces from 1944 to 1947. He then attended the University of Michigan, where he received in 1955 his Ph.D. in zoology. His doctoral thesis was "on the anatomy and systematic biology of the sea-ducks (Mergini)." For the two academic years 1955–1956 and 1956–1957 he worked in the University of Michigan's Museum of Zoology.

From 1957 to 1962 at Yale University, Humphrey was an assistant professor of zoology, as well as an assistant curator of ornithology at Yale's Peabody Museum of Natural History, where S. Dillon Ripley was the director. In 1959 Humphrey and Kenneth C. Parkes published an important paper on molts and plumages. In 1959 Humphrey conducted field studies in Haiti. He was a Guggenheim Fellow for the academic year 1959–1960. For the academic year 1960–1961 he studied birds in Argentina. For three months in late 1960 in Patagonia, he worked with Roger Tory Peterson.

In June 1962 Humphrey became the Curator of the Division of Birds at the National Museum of Natural History administered by the Smithsonian Institution. From 1965 to 1967, he chaired the National Museum's Department of Vertebrate Zoology. While working for the Smithsonian Institution, he was the principal investigator for the Pacific Ocean Biological Survey Program, which lasted from 1962 to 1969. In 1967 he left the Smithsonian Institution to become a professor at the University of Kansas, but he continued as the principal investigator for the Survey and, as a research associate, retained a connection with the Smithsonian Institution.

... at the invitation of the Rockefeller Foundation, he did field work in the Amazon of Brazil in the vicinity of Belem at various times during 1962–1965 and conducted studies of avian ecology in conjunction with the epidemiology of arthropod-borne viruses.

At the University of Kansas, he was the director of the University of Kansas's Natural History Museum and a professor in the Department of Zoology, which he also chaired. In 1969 he also became a professor in the newly formed Department of Systematics and Ecology. He retired as professor emeritus in 1995. In 1981 he, together with Max C. Thompson, identified a new species of steamer-duck, named by them Tachyeres leucocephalus. Humphrey was the author or co-author of nearly 100 articles.

He was elected a Fellow of the American Association for the Advancement of Science in 1981.

He married Mary Louise Countryman on 1 January 1946. Upon his death he was survived by his widow, a daughter, a son, three grandchildren, and four great-grandchildren.

== Selected publications ==
- Humphrey, Philip S. (1958). "Classification and Systematic Position of the Eiders". The Condor. 60 (2): 129–135. doi:10.2307/1365269. JSTOR 1365269.
- Humphrey, Philip S.; Clark, George A. (1961). "Pterylosis of the Mallard Duck". The Condor. 63 (5): 365–385. doi:10.2307/1365296. JSTOR 1365296.
- Shope, Robert E.; De Andrade, Amelia Homobono Paes; Bensabath, Gilberta; Causey, Ottis R.; Humphrey, Philip S. (1966). "The Epidemiology of EEE, Wee, Sle and Turlock Viruses, with Special Reference to Birds, in a Tropical Rain Forest Near Belem, Brazil1". American Journal of Epidemiology. 84 (3): 467–477. doi:10.1093/oxfordjournals.aje.a120659. PMID 6005906.
- Humphrey, Philip S.; Bridge, David; Lovejoy, Thomas E. (1968). "A Technique for Mist-Netting in the Forest Canopy". Bird-Banding. 39 (1): 43–50. doi:10.2307/4511439. JSTOR 4511439.
- Billard, Ruth S.; Humphrey, Philip S. (1972). "Molts and Plumages in the Greater Scaup". The Journal of Wildlife Management. 36 (3): 765–774. doi:10.2307/3799429. JSTOR 3799429.
- Humphrey, Philip S.; Livezey, Bradley C. (1982). "Flightlessness in Flying Steamer-Ducks". The Auk. 99 (2): 368–372. JSTOR 4085987.
- Livezey, Bradley C.; Humphrey, Philip S. (1983). "Mechanics of Steaming in Steamer-Ducks". The Auk. 100 (2): 485–488. doi:10.1093/auk/100.2.485. JSTOR 4086543.
- Livezey, Bradley C.; Humphrey, Philip S. (1984). "Sexual Dimorphism in Continental Steamer-Ducks". The Condor. 86 (4): 368–377. doi:10.2307/1366809. JSTOR 1366809.
- Livezey, Bradley C.; Humphrey, Philip S. (1985). "Territoriality and Interspecific Aggression in Steamer-Ducks". The Condor. 87 (1): 154–157. doi:10.2307/1367152. JSTOR 1367152.
- Livezey, Bradley C.; Humphrey, Philip S. (1986). "Flightlessness in Steamer-Ducks (Anatidae: Tachyeres ): ITS Morphological Bases and Probable Evolution". Evolution. 40 (3): 540–558. doi:10.1111/j.1558-5646.1986.tb00506.x. PMID 28556327. S2CID 6202430.
- Krishtalka, Leonard; Humphrey, Philip S. (2000). "Can Natural History Museums Capture the Future?". BioScience. 50 (7): 611. doi:10.1641/0006-3568(2000)050[0611:CNHMCT]2.0.CO;2. hdl:1808/16508. ISSN 0006-3568.
