= List of birds of Puerto Rico =

This is a list of the bird species recorded in the archipelago of Puerto Rico, which consists of the main island of Puerto Rico, two island municipalities off the east coast (Vieques and Culebra), three uninhabited islands off the west coast (Mona, Monito and Desecheo) and more than 125 smaller cays and islands.

The avifauna of Puerto Rico included a total of 385 species as of July 2022, according to Bird Checklists of the World. Of them, 201 are accidental, two have been extirpated, and one is believed to be extinct. Seventeen species are endemic. Non-native species are common; 43 listed here were introduced by humans. Individuals of many other species (mostly parrots, finches, and waxbills) are flying free, presumably after escaping or being released from captivity. For example, a 2018 study on introduced Psittacidae on the island found at least 46 species present, of which 24% are only found in the pet trade (captivity), 48% have been observed in the wild (but are not known to be breeding), and 28% are established (naturalized) and know to have bred or are currently breeding. Around 120 species breed in Puerto Rico while the majority of the others overwinter in the archipelago. An additional accidental species has been added from another source.

This list is presented in the taxonomic sequence of the Check-list of North and Middle American Birds, 7th edition through the 63rd Supplement, published by the American Ornithological Society (AOS). Common and scientific names are also those of the Check-list, except that the common names of families are from the Clements taxonomy because the AOS list does not include them.

The following tags have been used to highlight several categories of occurrence:

- (A) Accidental - a species that rarely or accidentally occurs in Puerto Rico
- (E) Endemic - a species endemic to Puerto Rico
- (Ex) Extirpated - a species that no longer occurs in Puerto Rico although populations exist elsewhere
- (I) Introduced - a species introduced to Puerto Rico as a consequence, direct or indirect, of human actions
- (X) Extinct - a species which no longer exists

== Ducks, geese, and waterfowl ==
Order: Anseriformes Family: Anatidae

The Anatidae include the ducks and most duck-like waterfowl, such as geese and swans. These birds are adapted to an aquatic existence with webbed feet, bills which are flattened to a greater or lesser extent, and feathers that are excellent at shedding water due to special oils.

- Black-bellied whistling-duck, Dendrocygna autumnalis (A)
- West Indian whistling-duck, Dendrocygna arborea
- Fulvous whistling-duck, Dendrocygna bicolor (A)
- White-faced whistling-duck, Dendrocygna bicolor (Ex)
- Snow goose, Anser caerulescens (A)
- Brant, Branta bernicla (A)
- Canada goose, Branta canadensis (A)
- Tundra swan, Cygnus columbianus (A)
- Wood duck, Aix sponsa (A)
- Garganey Spatula querquedula (A)
- Blue-winged teal, Spatula discors
- Cinnamon teal, Spatula cyanoptera (A)
- Northern shoveler, Spatula clypeata (A)
- Gadwall, Mareca strepera (A)
- Eurasian wigeon, Mareca penelope (A)
- American wigeon, Mareca americana (A)
- Mallard, Anas platyrhynchos (A)
- American black duck, Anas rubripes (A)
- White-cheeked pintail, Anas bahamensis
- Northern pintail, Anas acuta (A)
- Green-winged teal, Anas crecca (A)
- Canvasback, Aythya valisineria (A)
- Ring-necked duck, Aythya collaris (A)
- Tufted duck, Aythya fuligula (A)
- Lesser scaup, Aythya affinis (A)
- Bufflehead, Bucephala albeola (A)
- Hooded merganser, Lophodytes cucullatus (A)
- Red-breasted merganser, Mergus serrator (A)
- Masked duck, Nomonyx dominicus
- Ruddy duck, Oxyura jamaicensis
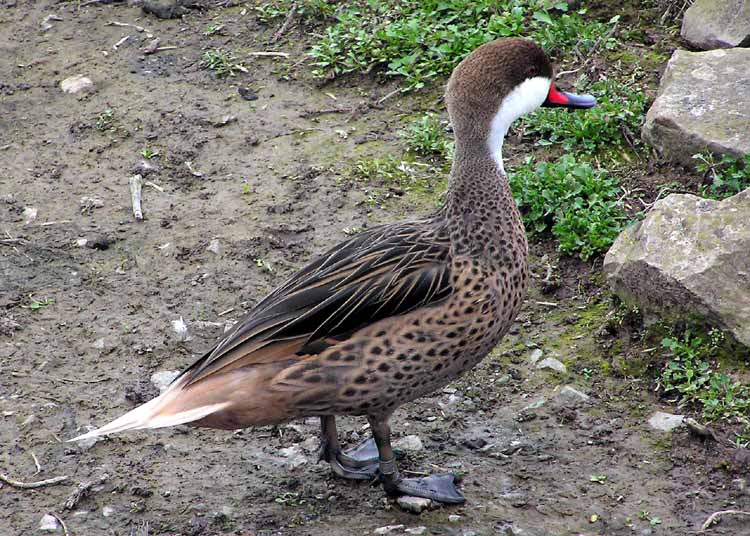
White-cheeked pintail, a species which can be found on the salt flats of Vieques.

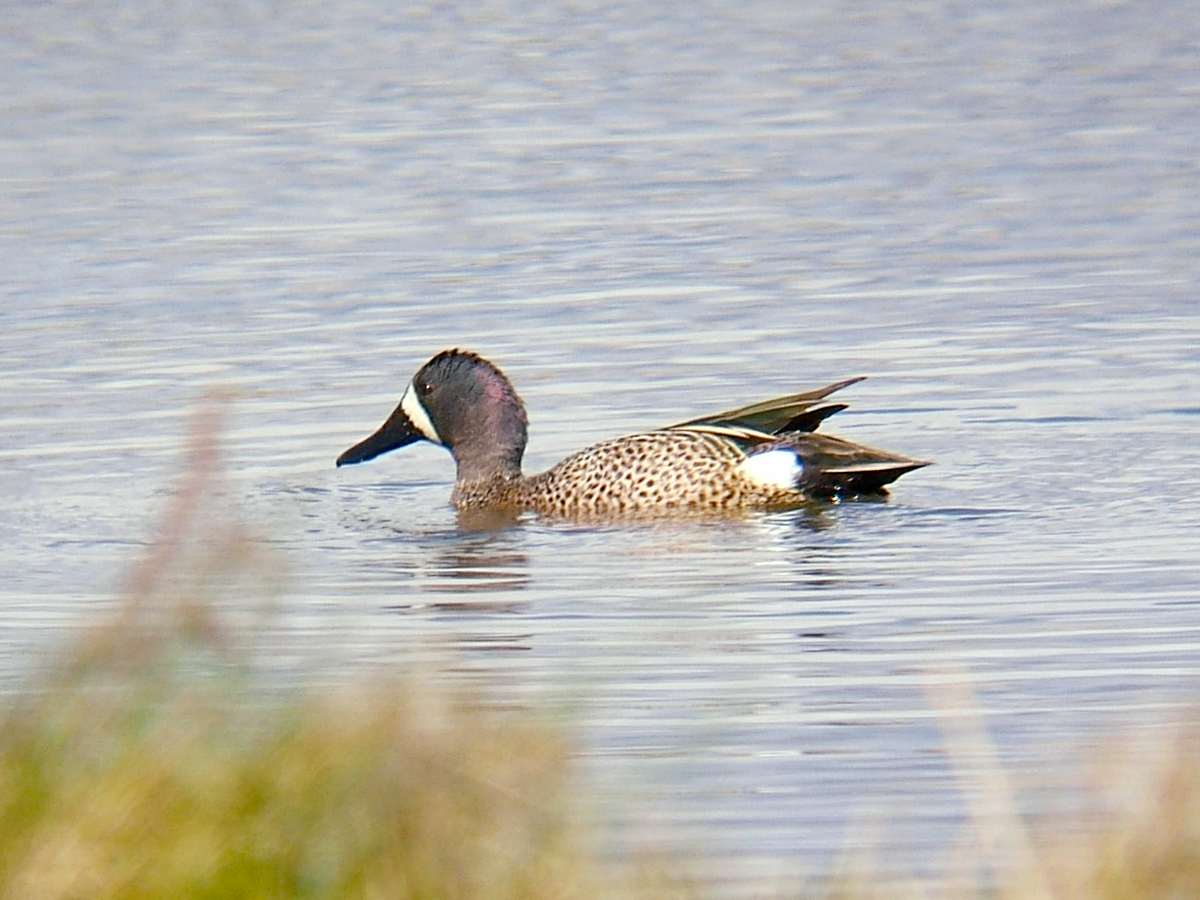
Blue-winged teal, this non-breeding species may be found in both the north and south regions of the main island.

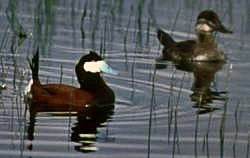
Ruddy duck, this breeding species is typically found in Puerto Rico's northern coastal areas.

== Guineafowl ==
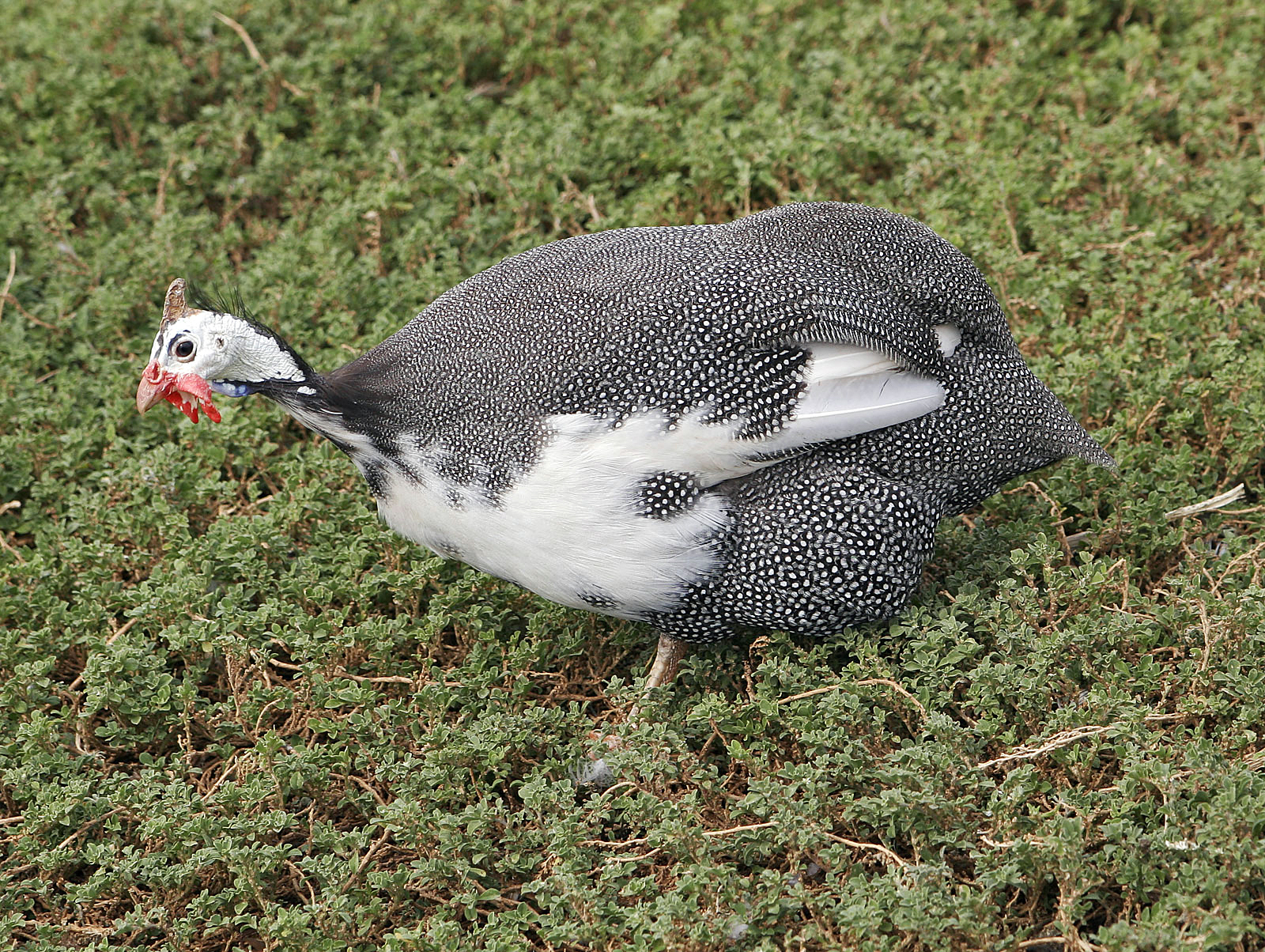
Helmeted guineafowl

Order: Galliformes Family: Numididae

Guineafowls are a group of African seed-eating, ground-nesting birds resembling partridges, but with featherless heads and spangled gray plumage.

- Helmeted guineafowl, Numida meleagris (I)

== New World quail ==
Order: Galliformes Family: Odontophoridae

The New World quails are small, plump terrestrial birds only distantly related to the quails of the Old World, but named for their similar appearance and habits.

- Northern bobwhite, Colinus virginianus (I)

== Pheasants, grouse, and allies ==
Order: Galliformes Family: Phasianidae

The Phasianidae are a family of terrestrial birds which consists of quails, partridges, snowcocks, francolins, spurfowls, tragopans, monals, pheasants, peafowls, and jungle fowls. In general, they are plump (although they vary in size) and have broad, relatively short wings.

- Red junglefowl, Gallus gallus (I)

== Flamingos ==
Order: Phoenicopteriformes Family: Phoenicopteridae

Flamingos are gregarious wading birds, usually 3 to 5 feet (0.9 to 1.5 m) tall, found in both the Western and Eastern Hemispheres. Flamingos filter-feed on shellfish and algae. Their oddly shaped beaks are specially adapted to separate mud and silt from the food they consume and, uniquely, are used upside-down.

- American flamingo, Phoenicopterus ruber (A)

== Grebes ==
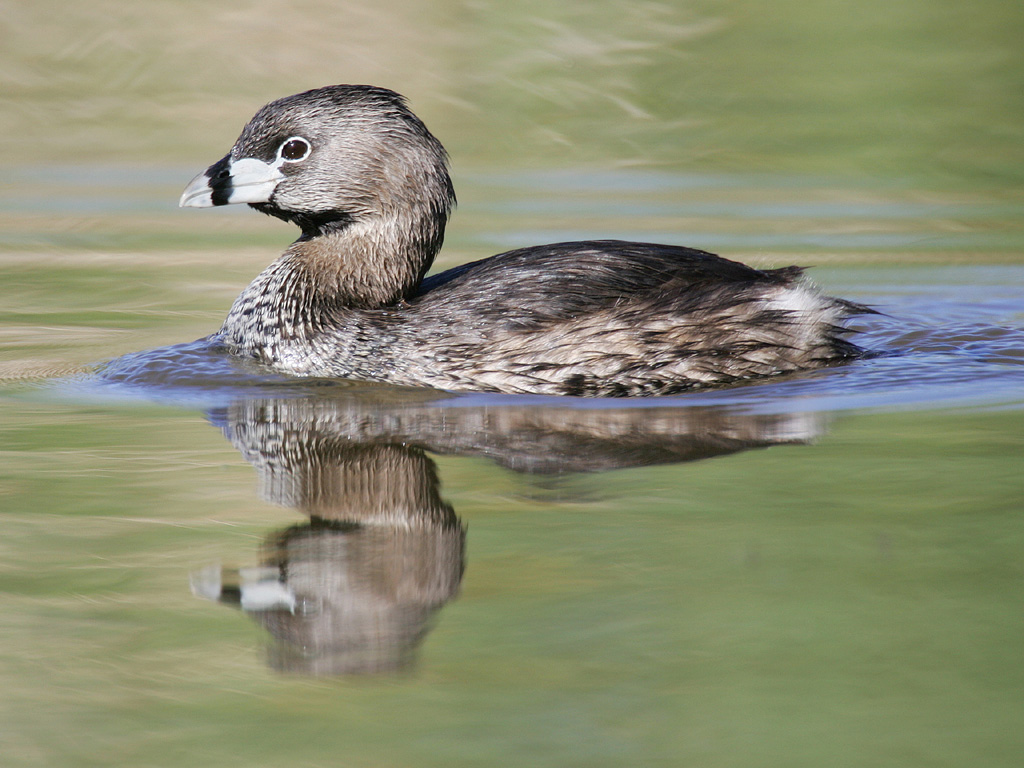
Pied-billed grebe, commonly known as zaramago in Spanish.

Order: Podicipediformes Family: Podicipedidae

Grebes are small to medium-large freshwater diving birds. They have lobed toes and are excellent swimmers and divers. However, they have their feet placed far back on the body, making them quite ungainly on land.

- Least grebe, Tachybaptus dominicus
- Pied-billed grebe, Podilymbus podiceps

== Pigeons and doves ==
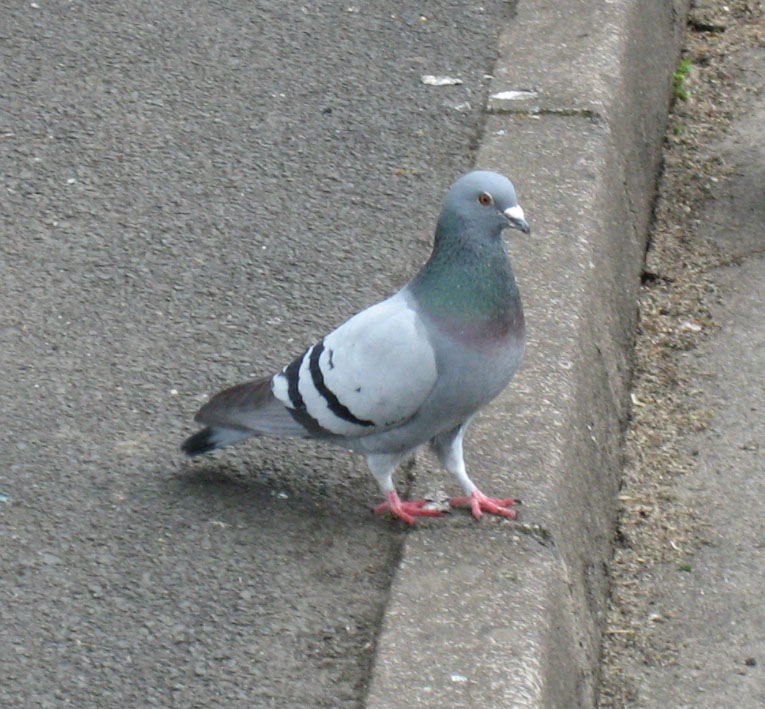
Rock pigeon, a common occurrence in the urban areas of Puerto Rico.

Order: Columbiformes Family: Columbidae

Pigeons and doves are stout-bodied birds with short necks and short slender bills with a fleshy cere.

- Rock pigeon, Columba livia (I)
- Scaly-naped pigeon, Patagioenas squamosa
- White-crowned pigeon, Patagioenas leucocephala
- Plain pigeon, Patagioenas inornata
- African collared-dove, Streptopelia roseogrisea (I)
- Eurasian collared-dove, Streptopelia decaocto (I)
- Diamond dove, Geopelia cuneata (I)
- Common ground dove, Columbina passerina
- Ruddy ground dove, Columbina talpacoti (A)
- Ruddy quail-dove, Geotrygon montana
- Key West quail-dove, Geotrygon chrysia
- Bridled quail-dove, Geotrygon mystacea (A)
- White-winged dove, Zenaida asiatica
- Zenaida dove, Zenaida aurita
- Mourning dove, Zenaida macroura

== Cuckoos ==
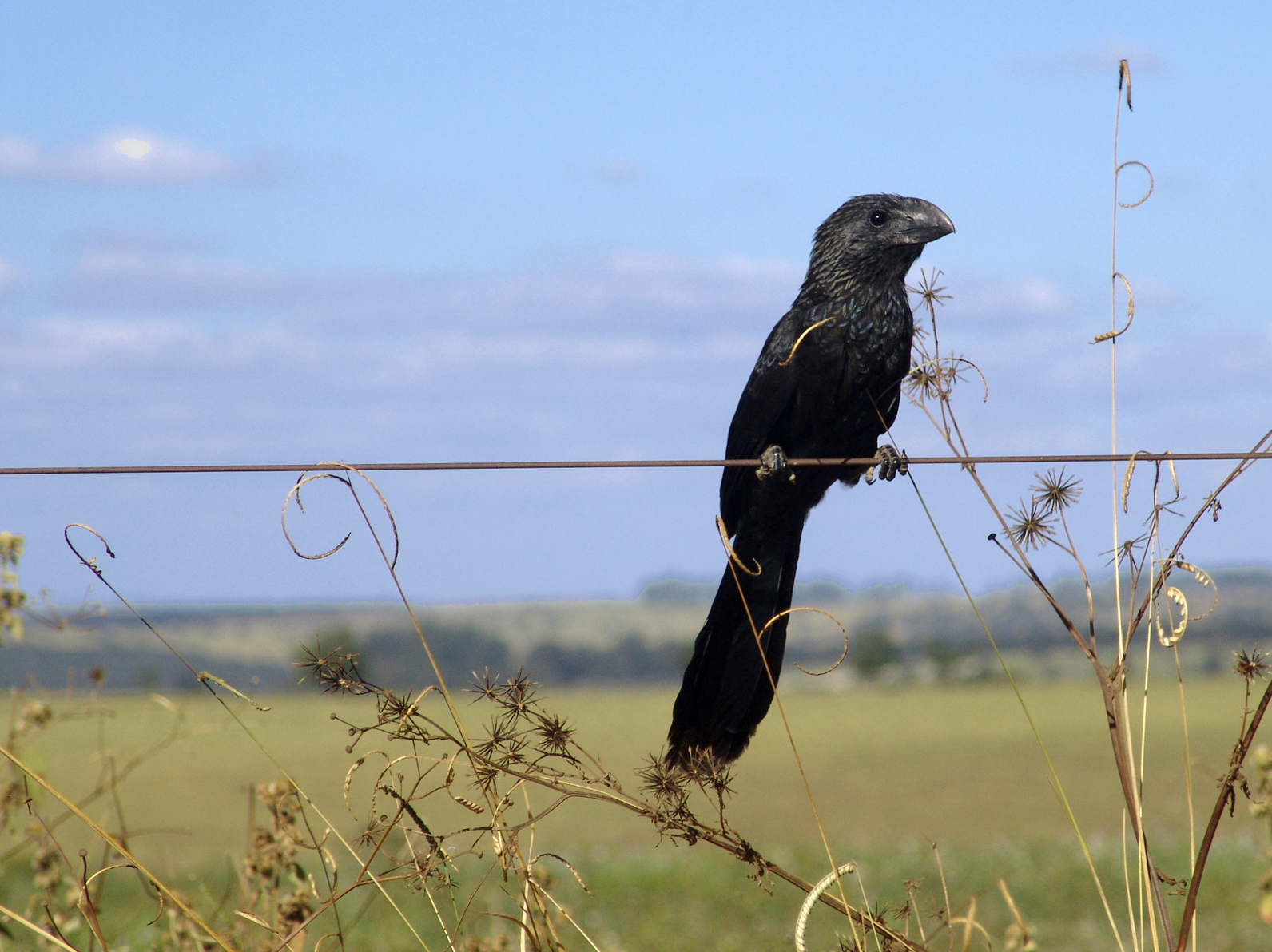
Smooth-billed ani, a species which can be found in urban areas.

Order: Cuculiformes Family: Cuculidae

The family Cuculidae includes cuckoos, roadrunners, and anis. These birds are of variable size with slender bodies, long tails, and strong legs. The Old World cuckoos are brood parasites.

- Smooth-billed ani, Crotophaga ani
- Yellow-billed cuckoo, Coccyzus americanus
- Mangrove cuckoo, Coccyzus minor
- Black-billed cuckoo, Coccyzus erythropthalmus (A)
- Puerto Rican lizard-cuckoo, Coccyzus vieilloti (E)

== Nightjars and allies ==
Order: Caprimulgiformes Family: Caprimulgidae

Nightjars are medium-sized nocturnal birds that usually nest on the ground. They have long wings, short legs, and very short bills. Most have small feet, of little use for walking, and long pointed wings. Their soft plumage is cryptically colored to resemble bark or leaves.

- Common nighthawk, Chordeiles minor (A)
- Antillean nighthawk, Chordeiles gundlachii
- Chuck-will's-widow, Antrostomus carolinensis (A)
- Puerto Rican nightjar, Antrostomus noctitherus (E)
- White-tailed nightjar, Hydropsalis cayennensis (A)

== Potoos ==
Order: Nyctibiiformes Family: Nyctibiidae

Potoos are a group of large near passerine birds related to the nightjars and frogmouths. These are nocturnal insectivores which lack the bristles around the mouth found in the true nightjars.

- Northern potoo, Nyctibius jamaicensis (A)

== Swifts ==
Order: Apodiformes Family: Apodidae

Swifts are small birds which spend the majority of their lives flying. These birds have very short legs and never settle voluntarily on the ground, perching instead only on vertical surfaces. Many swifts have long swept-back wings which resemble a crescent or boomerang.

- Black swift, Cypseloides niger
- White-collared swift, Streptoprocne zonaris (A)
- Chimney swift, Chaetura pelagica (A)
- Common swift, Apus apus (A)
- Alpine swift, Apus melba (A)
- Antillean palm-swift, Tachornis phoenicobia (A)

== Hummingbirds ==
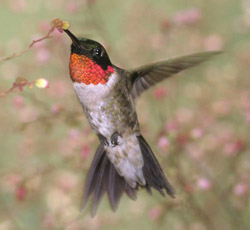
Ruby-throated hummingbird, a species which occurs accidentally in Puerto Rico.

Order: Apodiformes Family: Trochilidae

Hummingbirds are small birds capable of hovering in mid-air due to the rapid flapping of their wings. They are the only birds that can fly backwards.

- Puerto Rican mango, Anthracothorax aurulentus
- Green mango, Anthracothorax viridis (E)
- Purple-throated carib, Eulampis jugularis (A)
- Green-throated carib, Eulampis holosericeus
- Ruby-throated hummingbird, Archilochus colubris (A)
- Vervain hummingbird, Mellisuga minima (A)
- Puerto Rican emerald, Riccordia maugaeus (E)
- Antillean crested hummingbird, Orthorhyncus cristatus

== Rails, gallinules, and coots ==
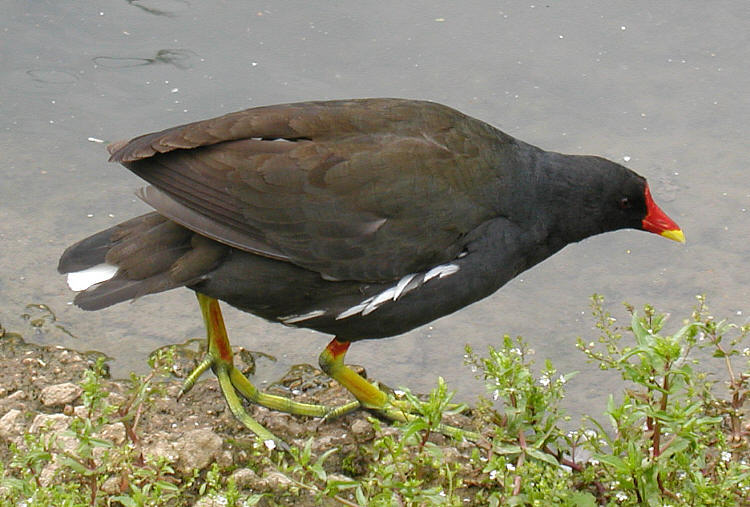
Common gallinule, this species can be commonly seen in the botanical garden of the University of Puerto Rico at Río Piedras.

Order: Gruiformes Family: Rallidae

Rallidae is a large family of small to medium-sized birds which includes the rails, crakes, coots, and gallinules. The most typical family members occupy dense vegetation in damp environments near lakes, swamps, or rivers. In general they are shy and secretive birds, making them difficult to observe. Most species have strong legs and long toes which are well adapted to soft uneven surfaces. They tend to have short, rounded wings and to be weak fliers.

- Clapper rail, Rallus crepitans
- Virginia rail, Rallus limicola (A)
- Sora, Porzana carolina (A)
- Common gallinule, Gallinula galeata
- American coot, Fulica americana
- Purple gallinule, Porphyrio martinicus
- Yellow-breasted crake, Hapalocrex flaviventer
- Black rail, Laterallus jamaicensis (A)
- Antillean cave rail, Nesotrochis debooyi (E) (X)

== Limpkin ==
Order: Gruiformes Family: Aramidae

The limpkin is an odd bird that looks like a large rail, but is skeletally closer to the cranes.

- Limpkin, Aramus guarauna

== Stilts and avocets ==
Order: Charadriiformes Family: Recurvirostridae

Recurvirostridae is a family of large wading birds which includes the avocets and stilts. The avocets have long legs and long up-curved bills. The stilts have extremely long legs and long, thin, straight bills.

- Black-necked stilt, Himantopus mexicanus
- American avocet, Recurvirostra americana (A)

== Oystercatchers ==
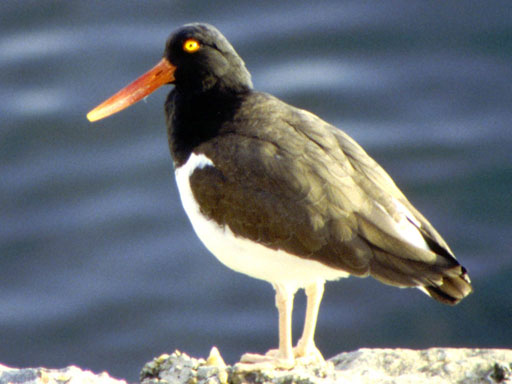
American oystercatcher, this breeding species can be found almost anywhere along the coast.

Order: Charadriiformes Family: Haematopodidae

The oystercatchers are large, obvious and noisy plover-like birds, with strong bills used for smashing or prising open molluscs.

- American oystercatcher, Haematopus palliatus

== Plovers and lapwings ==
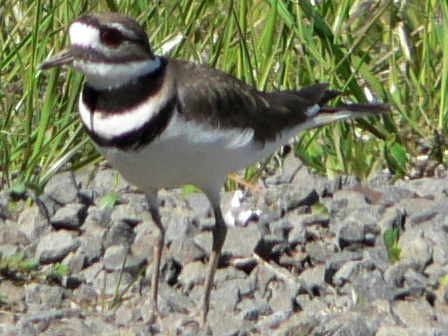
Killdeer, a species that breeds in Puerto Rico.

Order: Charadriiformes Family: Charadriidae

The family Charadriidae includes the plovers, dotterels, and lapwings. They are small to medium-sized birds with compact bodies, short thick necks, and long, usually pointed, wings. They are found in open country worldwide, mostly in habitats near water.

- Northern lapwing, Vanellus vanellus (A)
- Black-bellied plover, Pluvialis squatarola
- American golden-plover, Pluvialis dominica (A)
- Killdeer, Charadrius vociferus
- Semipalmated plover, Charadrius semipalmatus
- Piping plover, Charadrius melodus (A)
- Wilson's plover, Charadrius wilsonia
- Snowy plover, Charadrius nivosus

== Jacanas ==
Order: Charadriiformes Family: Jacanidae

The jacanas are a group of waders found worldwide within the tropical zone. They are identifiable by their huge feet and claws which enable them to walk on floating vegetation in the shallow lakes that are their preferred habitat.

- Northern jacana, Jacana spinosa (A)

== Sandpipers and allies ==
Order: Charadriiformes Family: Scolopacidae

Scolopacidae is a large diverse family of small to medium-sized shorebirds including the sandpipers, curlews, godwits, shanks, tattlers, woodcocks, snipes, dowitchers, and phalaropes. The majority of these species eat small invertebrates picked out of the mud or soil. Different lengths of legs and bills enable multiple species to feed in the same habitat, particularly on the coast, without direct competition for food.

- Upland sandpiper, Bartramia longicauda (A)
- Whimbrel, Numenius phaeopus (A)
- Eskimo curlew, Numenius borealis (A) (possibly extinct)
- Long-billed curlew, Numenius americanus (A)
- Eurasian curlew, Numenius arquata (A)
- Hudsonian godwit, Limosa haemastica (A)
- Marbled godwit, Limosa fedoa (A)
- Ruddy turnstone, Arenaria interpres
- Red knot, Calidris canutus (A)
- Ruff, Calidris pugnax (A)
- Stilt sandpiper, Calidris himantopus
- Curlew sandpiper, Calidris ferruginea (A)
- Sanderling, Calidris alba
- Dunlin, Calidris alpina (A)
- Baird's sandpiper, Calidris bairdii (A)
- Least sandpiper, Calidris minutilla
- White-rumped sandpiper, Calidris fuscicollis (A)
- Buff-breasted sandpiper, Calidris subruficollis (A)
- Pectoral sandpiper, Calidris melanotos
- Semipalmated sandpiper, Calidris pusilla
- Western sandpiper, Calidris mauri
- Short-billed dowitcher, Limnodromus griseus
- Long-billed dowitcher, Limnodromus scolopaceus (A)
- Wilson's snipe, Gallinago delicata (A)
- Spotted sandpiper, Actitis macularius
- Solitary sandpiper, Tringa solitaria
- Lesser yellowlegs, Tringa flavipes
- Willet, Tringa semipalmata
- Spotted redshank, Tringa erythropus (A)
- Common greenshank, Tringa nebularia (A)
- Greater yellowlegs, Tringa melanoleuca
- Wilson's phalarope, Phalaropus tricolor (A)
- Red-necked phalarope, Phalaropus lobatus (A)
- Red phalarope, Phalaropus fulicarius (A)
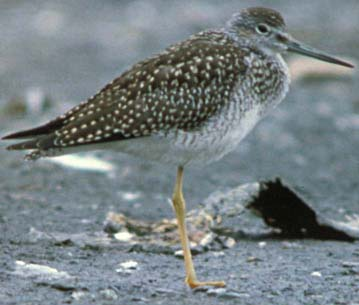
Greater yellowlegs, a common occurrence, except in summer, at the island of Culebra.

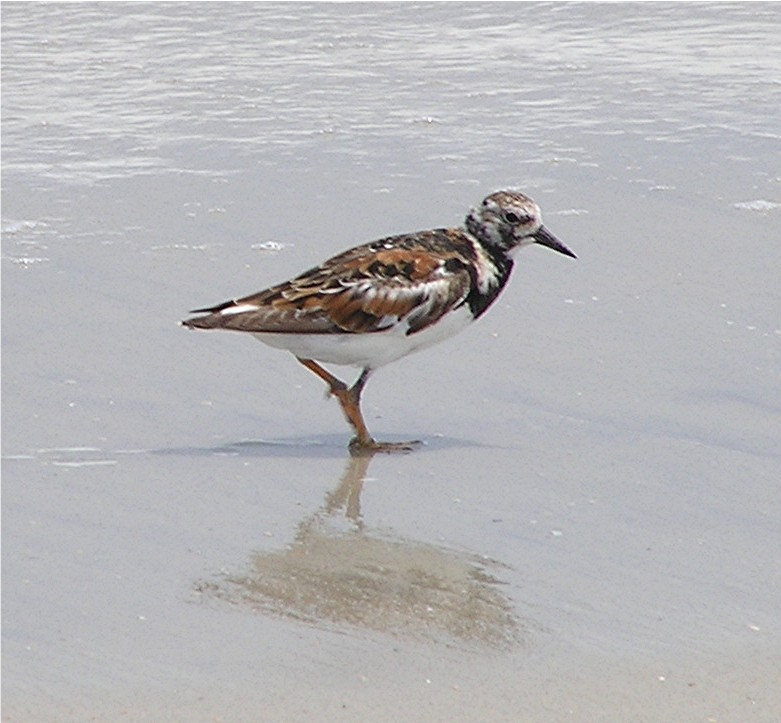
Ruddy turnstone, a non-breeding species commonly found near coastal waters.

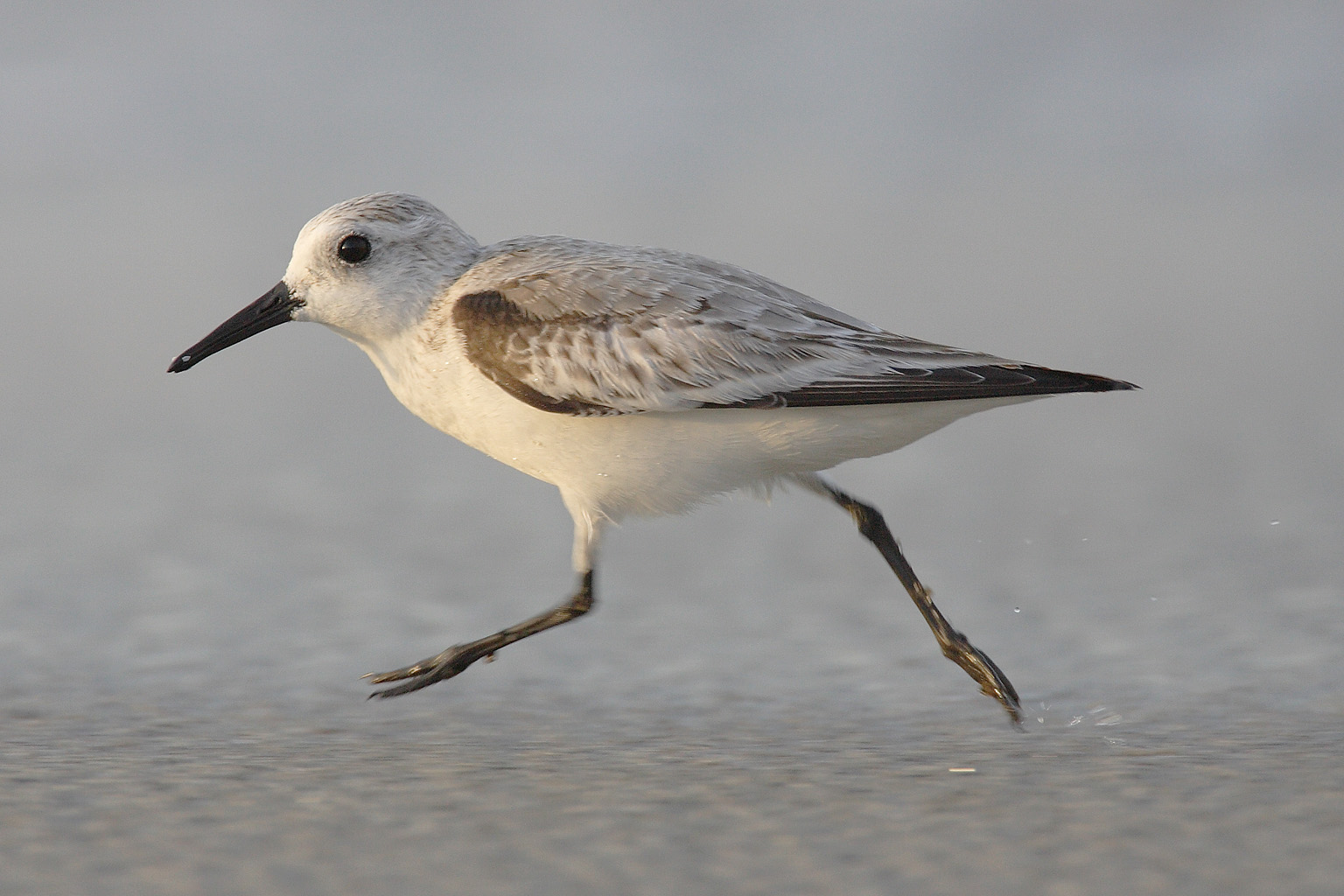
Sanderling, a non-breeding species commonly found near bodies of water.

== Skuas and jaegers ==
Order: Charadriiformes Family: Stercorariidae

The family Stercorariidae are, in general, medium to large birds, typically with gray or brown plumage, often with white markings on the wings. They nest on the ground in temperate and arctic regions and are long-distance migrants.

- Great skua, Stercorarius skua (A)
- South polar skua, Stercorarius maccormicki (A)
- Pomarine jaeger, Stercorarius pomarinus (A)
- Parasitic jaeger, Stercorarius parasiticus (A)
- Long-tailed jaeger, Stercorarius longicaudus (A)

== Gulls, terns, and skimmers ==
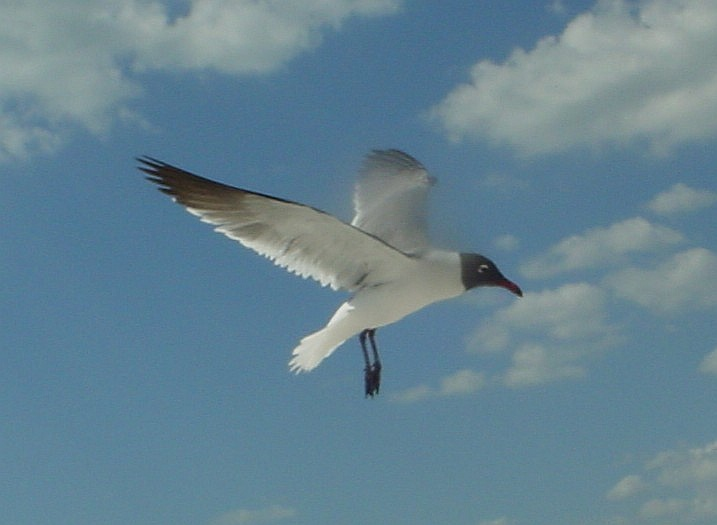
Laughing gull, the most common gull (gaviota) in Puerto Rico.

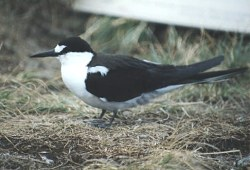
Sooty tern, this species nests in the Culebra National Reserve.

Order: Charadriiformes Family: Laridae

Laridae is a family of medium to large seabirds and includes gulls, kittiwakes, terns, and skimmers. They are typically gray or white, often with black markings on the head or wings. They have longish bills and webbed feet. Terns are a group of generally medium to large seabirds typically with gray or white plumage, often with black markings on the head. Most terns hunt fish by diving but some pick insects off the surface of fresh water. Terns are generally long-lived birds, with several species known to live in excess of 30 years. Skimmers are a small family of tropical tern-like birds. They have an elongated lower mandible which they use to feed flying low over the water surface and skimming the water for small fish.

- Black-legged kittiwake, Rissa tridactyla (A)
- Sabine's gull, Xema sabini (A)
- Bonaparte's gull, Chroicocephalus philadelphia (A)
- Black-headed gull, Chroicocephalus ridibundus (A)
- Little gull, Hydrocoloeus minutus (A)
- Laughing gull, Leucophaeus atricilla
- Franklin's gull, Leucophaeus pipixcan (A)
- Ring-billed gull, Larus delawarensis
- Herring gull, Larus argentatus (A)
- Yellow-legged gull, Larus michahellis (A)
- Lesser black-backed gull, Larus fuscus (A)
- Great black-backed gull, Larus marinus (A)
- Brown noddy, Anous stolidus
- Black noddy, Anous minutus (A)
- Sooty tern, Onychoprion fuscata
- Bridled tern, Onychoprion anaethetus
- Least tern, Sternula antillarum
- Gull-billed tern, Gelochelidon nilotica
- Caspian tern, Hydroprogne caspia (A)
- Black tern, Chlidonias niger
- White-winged tern, Chlidonias leucopterus (A)
- Roseate tern, Sterna dougallii
- Common tern, Sterna hirundo
- Arctic tern, Sterna paradisaea (A)
- Forster's tern, Sterna forsteri (A)
- Royal tern, Thalasseus maxima
- Sandwich tern, Thalasseus sandvicensis
- Black skimmer, Rynchops niger (A)

== Tropicbirds ==
Order: Phaethontiformes Family: Phaethontidae

Tropicbirds are slender white birds of tropical oceans with exceptionally long central tail feathers. Their long wings have black markings, as does the head.

- White-tailed tropicbird, Phaethon lepturus
- Red-billed tropicbird, Phaethon aethereus

== Southern storm-petrels ==
Order: Procellariiformes Family: Oceanitidae

The storm-petrels are the smallest seabirds, relatives of the petrels, feeding on planktonic crustaceans and small fish picked from the surface, typically while hovering. The flight is fluttering and sometimes bat-like. Until 2018, this family's species were included with the other storm-petrels in family Hydrobatidae.

- Wilson's storm-petrel, Oceanites oceanicus (A)

== Northern storm-petrels ==
Order: Procellariiformes Family: Hydrobatidae

Though the members of this family are similar in many respects to the southern storm-petrels, including their general appearance and habits, there are enough genetic differences to warrant their placement in a separate family.

- Leach's storm-petrel, Hydrobates leucorhous (A)

== Shearwaters and petrels ==
Order: Procellariiformes Family: Procellariidae

The Procellariids are the main group of medium-sized "true petrels", characterized by united nostrils with medium septum and a long outer functional primary.

- Trindade petrel, Pterodroma arminjoniana (A)
- Black-capped petrel, Pterodroma hasitata (A)
- Cory's shearwater, Calonectris diomedea (A)
- Great shearwater, Ardenna gravis (A)
- Sooty shearwater, Ardenna griseus (A)
- Manx shearwater, Puffinus puffinus (A)
- Sargasso shearwater, Puffinus lherminieri
- Barolo shearwater, Puffinus baroli (A)

== Storks ==
Order: Ciconiiformes Family: Ciconiidae

Storks are large, heavy, long-legged, long-necked wading birds with long stout bills and wide wingspans. They lack the powder down that other wading birds such as herons, spoonbills, and ibises use to clean off fish slime. Storks lack a pharynx and are mute.

- Wood stork, Mycteria americana (A)

== Frigatebirds ==
Order: Suliformes Family: Fregatidae

Frigatebirds are large seabirds usually found over tropical oceans. They are large, black, or black-and-white, with long wings and deeply forked tails. The males have colored inflatable throat pouches. They do not swim or walk and cannot take off from a flat surface. Having the largest wingspan-to-body-weight ratio of any bird, they are essentially aerial, able to stay aloft for more than a week.

- Magnificent frigatebird, Fregata magnificens

== Boobies and gannets ==
Order: Suliformes Family: Sulidae

The sulids comprise the gannets and boobies. Both groups are medium-large coastal seabirds that plunge-dive for fish.

- Masked booby, Sula dactylatra
- Brown booby, Sula leucogaster
- Red-footed booby, Sula sula
- Northern gannet, Morus bassanus (A)

== Cormorants and shags ==
Order: Suliformes Family: Phalacrocoracidae

Phalacrocoracidae is a family of medium to large coastal, fish-eating seabirds that includes cormorants and shags. Plumage coloration is varied with the majority having mainly dark plumage, some species being black-and-white, and a few being quite colorful.

- Double-crested cormorant, Nannopterum auritum (A)
- Neotropic cormorant, Nannopterum brasilianum (A)

== Pelicans ==
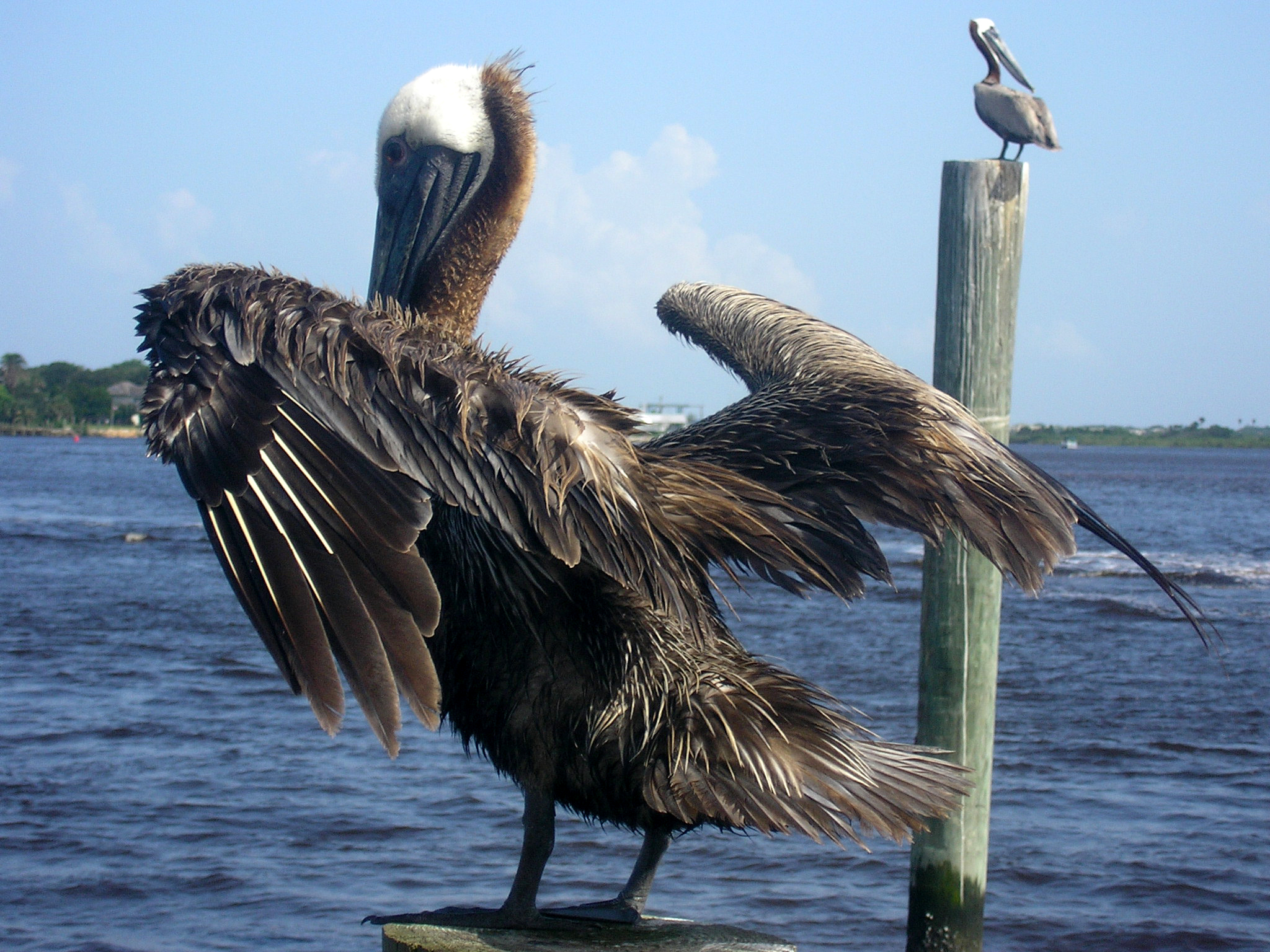
Brown pelican, a protected species which commonly occurs in Puerto Rico's coasts.

Order: Pelecaniformes Family: Pelecanidae

Pelicans are very large water birds with a distinctive pouch under their beak Like other birds in the order Pelecaniformes, they have four webbed toes.

- American white pelican, Pelecanus erythrorhynchos (A)
- Brown pelican, Pelecanus occidentalis

== Herons, egrets, and bitterns ==
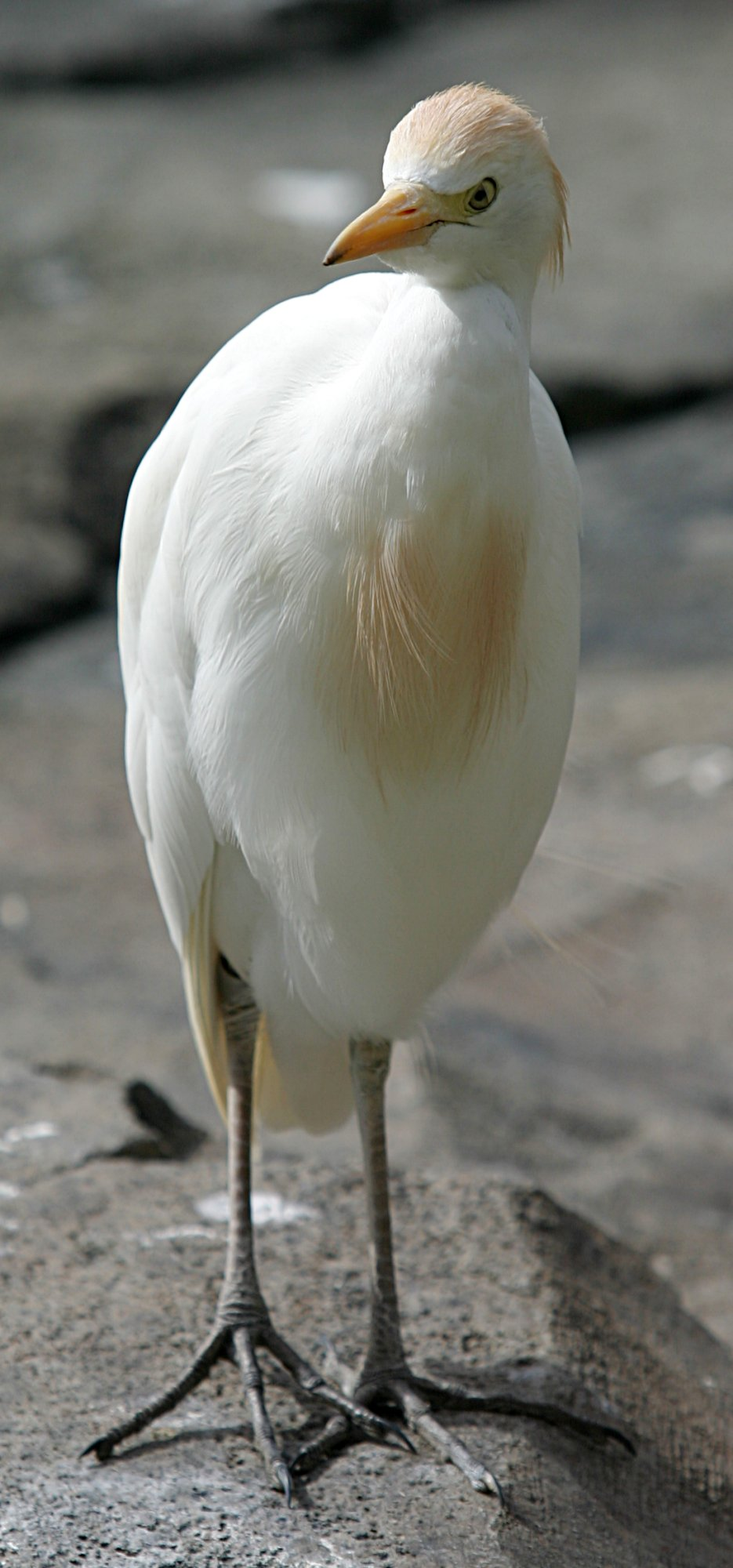
Cattle egret (garza in Spanish), a common bird in Puerto Rico's rural areas, usually found on top of cows.

Order: Pelecaniformes Family: Ardeidae

The family Ardeidae contains the bitterns, herons, and egrets. Herons and egrets are medium to large wading birds with long necks and legs. Bitterns tend to be shorter necked and more secretive. Members of Ardeidae fly with their necks retracted, unlike other long-necked birds such as storks, ibises, and spoonbills.

- American bittern, Botaurus lentiginosus (A)
- Least bittern, Ixobrychus exilis
- Great blue heron, Ardea herodias
- Great egret, Ardea alba
- Little egret, Egretta garzetta (A)
- Western reef-heron, Egretta gularis (A)
- Snowy egret, Egretta thula
- Little blue heron, Egretta caerulea
- Tricolored heron, Egretta tricolor
- Reddish egret, Egretta rufescens (A)
- Cattle egret, Bubulcus ibis
- Green heron, Butorides virescens
- Striated heron, Butorides striata (A)
- Black-crowned night-heron, Nycticorax nycticorax
- Yellow-crowned night-heron, Nyctanassa violacea

== Ibises and spoonbills ==
Order: Pelecaniformes Family: Threskiornithidae

Threskiornithidae is a family of large terrestrial and wading birds which includes the ibises and spoonbills. They have long, broad wings with 11 primary and about 20 secondary feathers. They are strong fliers and, rather surprisingly, given their size and weight, very capable soarers.

- White ibis, Eudocimus albus (A)
- Scarlet ibis, Eudocimus ruber (A)
- Glossy ibis, Plegadis falcinellus (A)
- Roseate spoonbill, Platalea ajaja (A)

== New World vultures ==
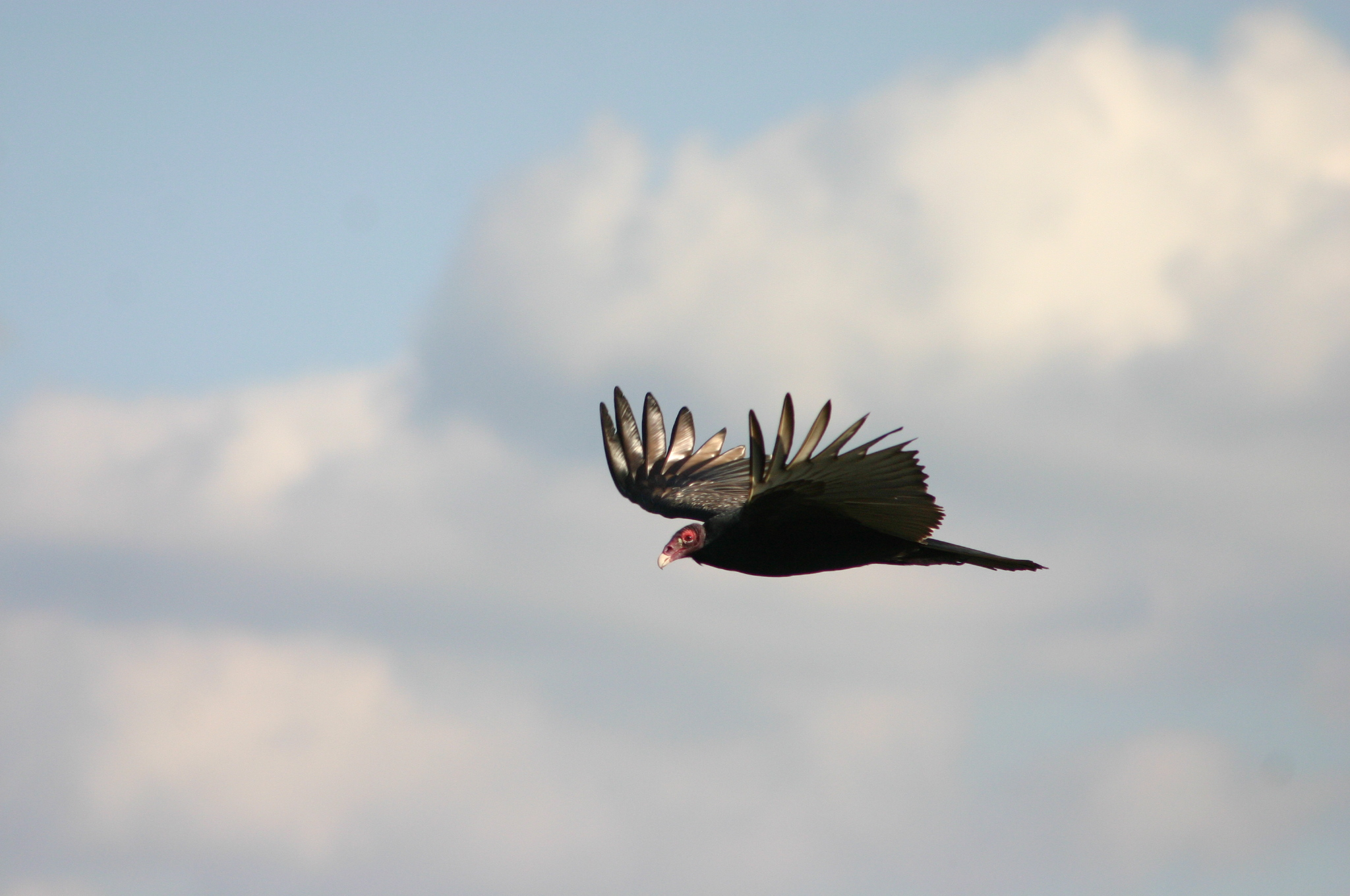
The turkey vulture (whose origin in the archipelago is unclear and may be an introduced species) has taken residence in Southwestern Puerto Rico, most notably in the Guánica State Forest.

Order: Cathartiformes Family: Cathartidae

The New World vultures are not closely related to Old World vultures, but superficially resemble them because of convergent evolution. Like the Old World vultures, they are scavengers. However, unlike Old World vultures, which find carcasses by sight, New World vultures have a good sense of smell with which they locate carcasses.

- Black vulture, Coragyps atratus (A)
- Turkey vulture, Cathartes aura (I)

== Osprey ==
Order: Accipitriformes Family: Pandionidae

The family Pandionidae contains only one species, the osprey. The osprey is a medium-large raptor which is a specialist fish-eater with a worldwide distribution.

- Osprey, Pandion haliaetus

== Hawks, eagles, and kites ==
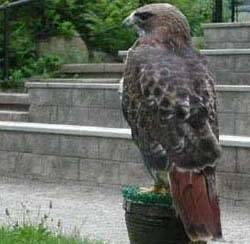
Red-tailed hawk, commonly known as guaraguao in Puerto Rico.

Order: Accipitriformes Family: Accipitridae

Accipitridae is a family of birds of prey, which includes hawks, eagles, kites, harriers, and Old World vultures. These birds have very large powerful hooked beaks for tearing flesh from their prey, strong legs, powerful talons, and keen eyesight.

- Swallow-tailed kite, Elanoides forficatus (A)
- Northern harrier, Circus hudsonius (A)
- Western marsh harrier, Circus aeruginosus (A)
- Sharp-shinned hawk, Accipiter striatus
- Bald eagle, Haliaeetus leucocephalus (A)
- Mississippi kite, Ictinia mississippiensis (A)
- Common black hawk, Buteogallus anthracinus
- Ridgway's hawk, Buteo ridgwayi (A)
- Broad-winged hawk, Buteo platypterus
- Red-tailed hawk, Buteo jamaicensis

== Barn-owls ==
Order: Strigiformes Family: Tytonidae

Barn-owls are medium to large owls with large heads and characteristic heart-shaped faces. They have long strong legs with powerful talons.

- Barn owl, Tyto alba
- Puerto Rican barn owl, Tyto cavatica (E) (X)

== Owls ==
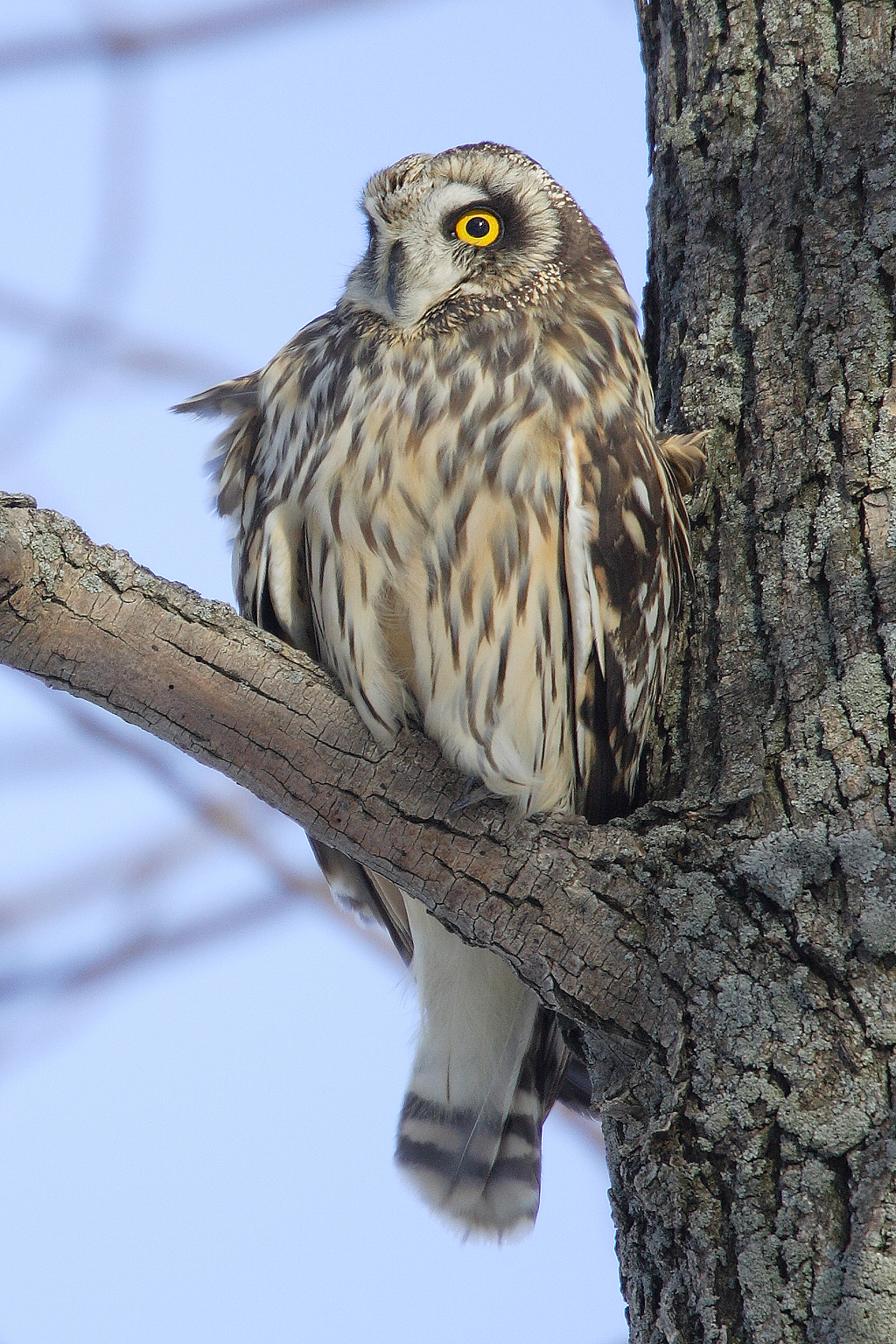
Short-eared owl, a species found in the southwestern municipality of Cabo Rojo.

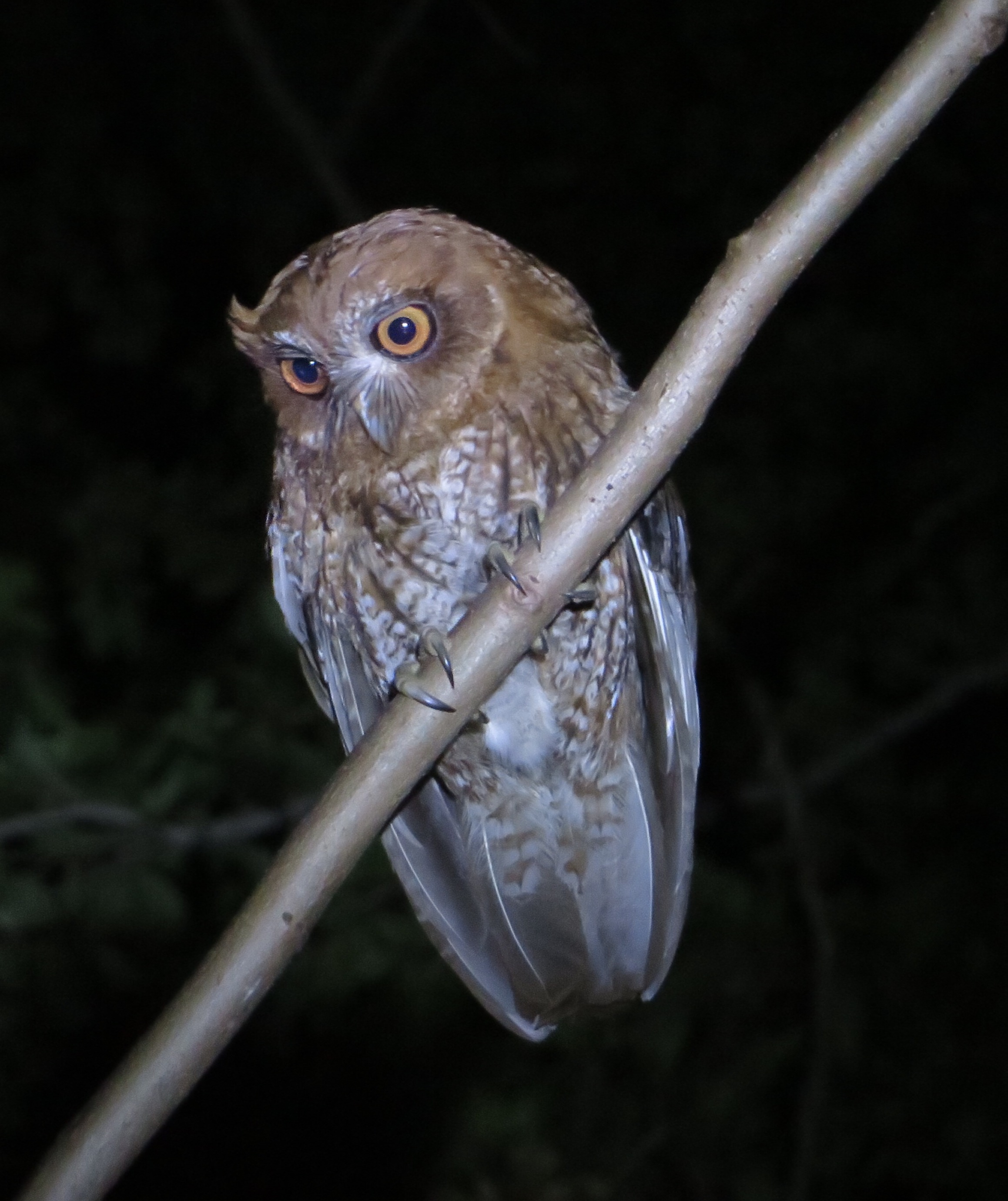
Puerto Rican owl, a species found in the western municipality of Aguada.

Order: Strigiformes Family: Strigidae

The typical owls are small to large solitary nocturnal birds of prey. They have large forward-facing eyes and ears, a hawk-like beak, and a conspicuous circle of feathers around each eye called a facial disk.

- Puerto Rican owl, Gymnasio nudipes
- Short-eared owl, Asio flammeus

== Todies ==
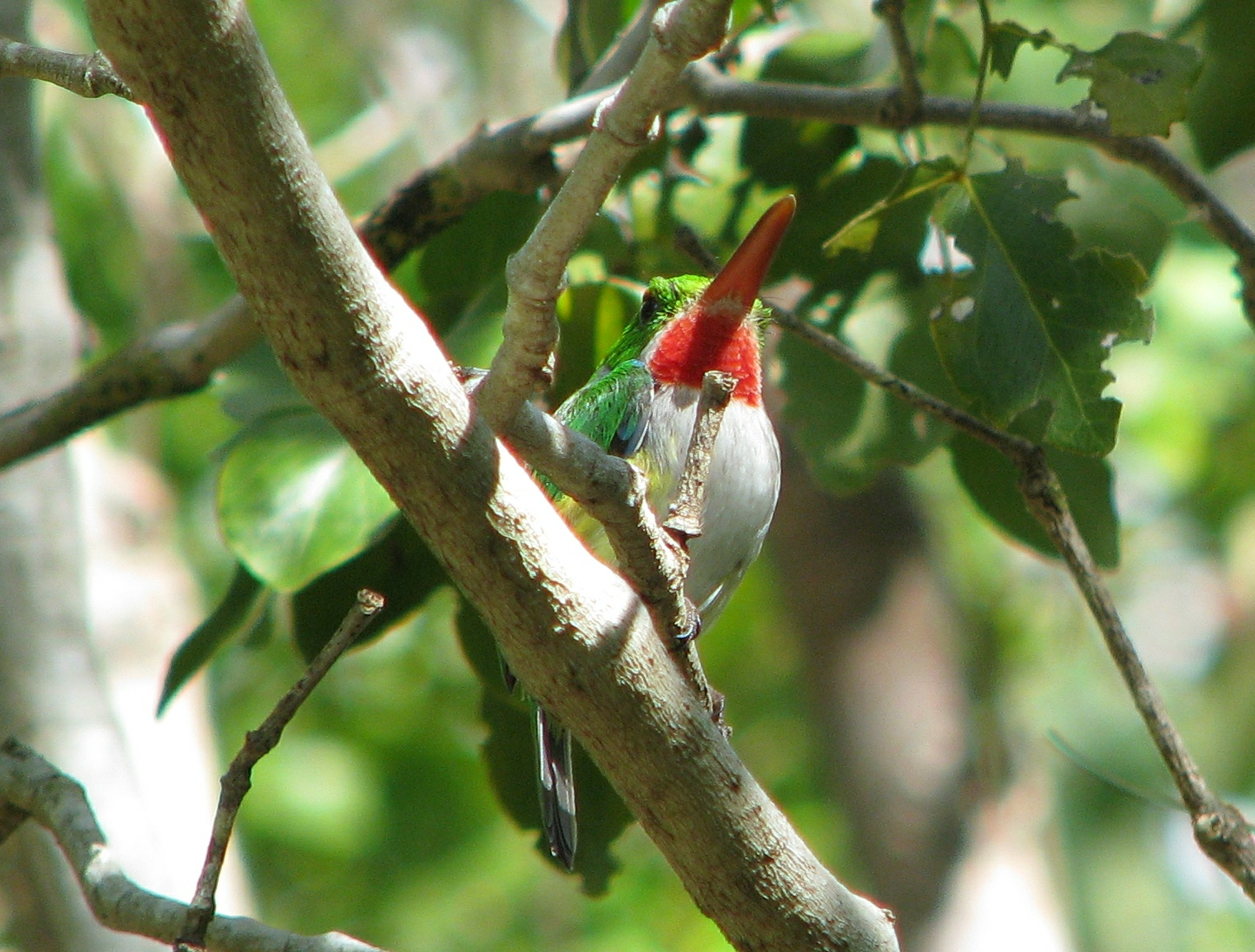
Puerto Rican tody, an endemic bird known as San Pedrito (little Saint Peter).

Order: Coraciiformes Family: Todidae

Todies are a group of small near passerine forest species endemic to the Caribbean. These birds have colorful plumage and resemble kingfishers, but have flattened bills with serrated edges. They eat small prey such as insects and lizards.

- Puerto Rican tody, Todus mexicanus (E)

== Kingfishers ==
Order: Coraciiformes Family: Alcedinidae

Kingfishers are medium-sized birds with large heads, long pointed bills, short legs, and stubby tails.

- Ringed kingfisher, Megaceryle torquatus (A)
- Belted kingfisher, Megaceryle alcyon

== Woodpeckers ==
Order: Piciformes Family: Picidae

Woodpeckers are small to medium-sized birds with chisel-like beaks, short legs, stiff tails, and long tongues used for capturing insects. Some species have feet with two toes pointing forward and two backward, while several species have only three toes. Many woodpeckers have the habit of tapping noisily on tree trunks with their beaks.

- Puerto Rican woodpecker, Melanerpes portoricensis (E)
- Yellow-bellied sapsucker, Sphyrapicus varius (A)
- Hairy woodpecker, Dryobates villosus (A)

== Falcons and caracaras ==
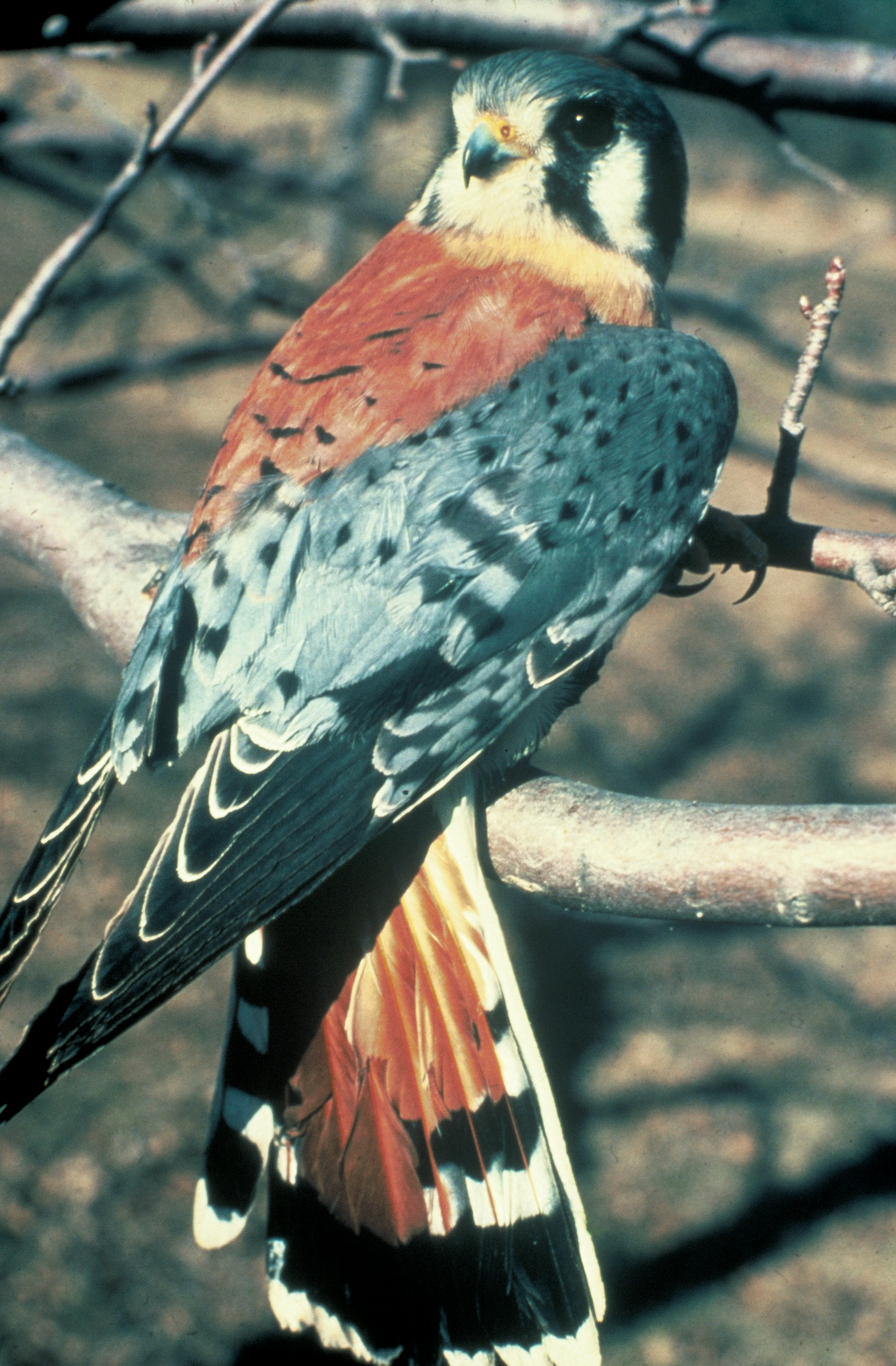
American kestrel, known as halcón común (common falcon) in Puerto Rico.

Order: Falconiformes Family: Falconidae

Falconidae is a family of diurnal birds of prey. They differ from hawks, eagles, and kites in that they kill with their beaks instead of their talons.

- American kestrel, Falco sparverius
- Merlin, Falco columbarius (A)
- Aplomado falcon, Falco femoralis (A)
- Peregrine falcon, Falco peregrinus

== Cockatoos ==
Order: Psittaciformes Family: Cacatuidae

The cockatoos share many features with other parrots including the characteristic curved beak shape and a zygodactyl foot, with two forward toes and two backwards toes. They differ, however in a number of characteristics, including the often spectacular movable headcrest.

- Sulphur-crested cockatoo, Cacatua galerita (I)
- White cockatoo, Cacatua alba (I)

== New World and African parrots ==
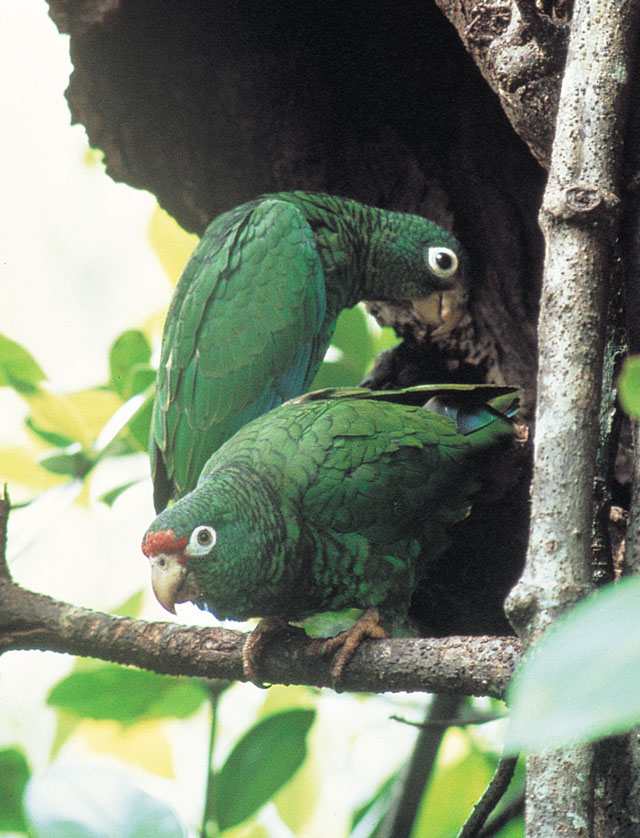
Puerto Rican parrot, an endemic species and one of the 10 most endangered birds in the world.

Order: Psittaciformes Family: Psittacidae

Characteristic features of parrots include a strong curved bill, an upright stance, strong legs, and clawed zygodactyl feet. Many parrots are vividly colored, and some are multi-colored. In size they range from 8 cm (3.1 in) to 1 m (3.3 ft) in length. Most of the more than 150 species in this family are found in the New World.

- Monk parakeet, Myiopsitta monachus (I)
- Orange-fronted parakeet, Eupsittula canicularis (I)
- Brown-throated parakeet, Eupsittula pertinax (I)
- Nanday parakeet, Aratinga nenday (I)
- Blue-and-yellow macaw, Ara ararauna (I)
- Puerto Rican parakeet, Psittacara maugei (E) (X)
- Red-masked parakeet, Psittacara erythrogenys (I)
- Hispaniolan parakeet, Psittacara chloropterus (I)
- White-winged parakeet Brotogeris versicolurus (I)
- Green-cheeked parakeet, Pyrrhura molinae (I)
- Orange-winged parrot, Amazona amazonica (I)
- White-fronted parrot, Amazona albifrons (I)
- Hispaniolan parrot, Amazona ventralis (I)
- Puerto Rican parrot, Amazona vittata (E)
- Red-crowned parrot, Amazona viridigenalis (I)
- Yellow-headed parrot, Amazona oratrix (I)
- Yellow-naped parrot, Amazona auropalliata (I)

== Tyrant flycatchers ==
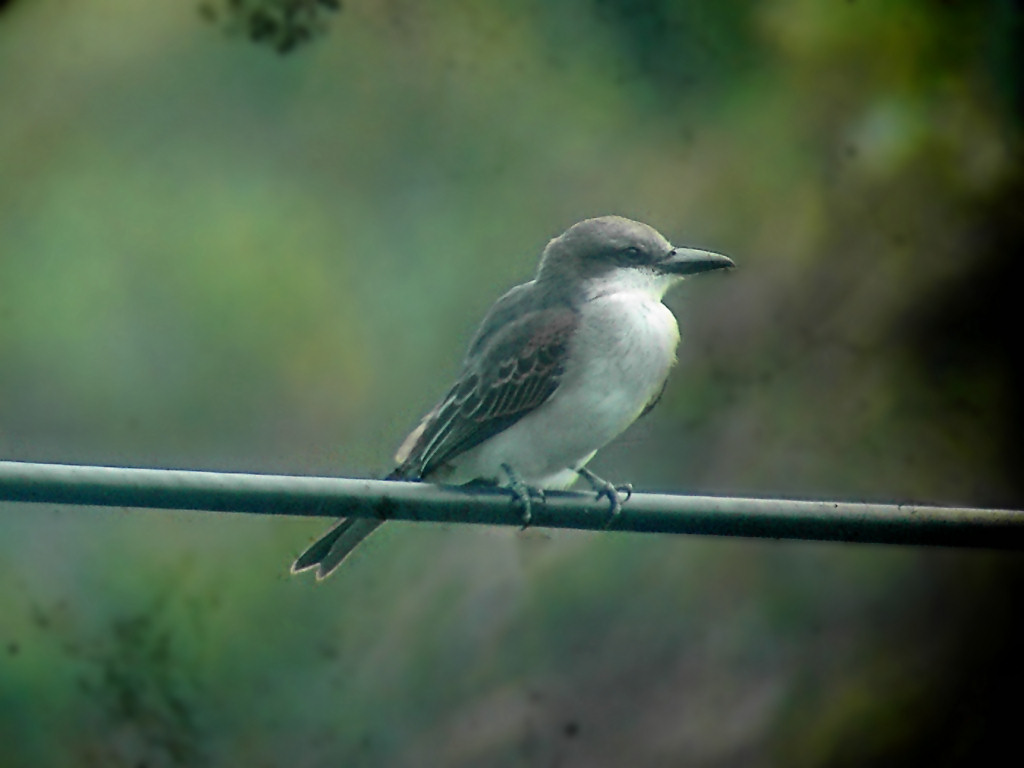
Gray kingbird, known as pitirre, an onomatopoeic name which describes the species' call.

Order: Passeriformes Family: Tyrannidae

Tyrant flycatchers are Passerine birds which occur throughout North and South America. They superficially resemble the Old World flycatchers, but are more robust and have stronger bills. They do not have the sophisticated vocal capabilities of the songbirds. Most, but not all, are rather plain. As the name implies, most are insectivorous.

- Caribbean elaenia, Elaenia martinica
- Great crested flycatcher, Myiarchus crinitus (A)
- Puerto Rican flycatcher, Myiarchus antillarum (E)
- Western kingbird, Tyrannus verticalis (A)
- Eastern kingbird, Tyrannus tyrannus (A)
- Gray kingbird, Tyrannus dominicensis
- Loggerhead kingbird, Tyrannus caudifasciatus
- Scissor-tailed flycatcher, Tyrannus forficatus (A)
- Fork-tailed flycatcher, Tyrannus savana (A)
- Eastern wood-pewee, Contopus virens (A)
- Hispaniolan pewee, Contopus hispaniolensis (A)
- Lesser Antillean pewee, Contopus latirostris
- Acadian flycatcher, Empidonax virescens (A)
- Willow flycatcher, Empidonax traillii (A)

== Vireos, shrike-babblers, and erpornis ==
Order: Passeriformes Family: Vireonidae

The vireos are a group of small to medium-sized passerine birds. They are typically greenish in color and resemble New World warblers apart from their heavier bills.

- White-eyed vireo, Vireo griseus (A)
- Puerto Rican vireo, Vireo latimeri (E)
- Yellow-throated vireo, Vireo flavifrons (A)
- Philadelphia vireo, Vireo philadelphicus (A)
- Warbling vireo, Vireo gilvus (A)
- Red-eyed vireo, Vireo olivaceus
- Black-whiskered vireo, Vireo altiloquus

== Crows, jays, and magpies ==
Order: Passeriformes Family: Corvidae

The family Corvidae includes crows, ravens, jays, choughs, magpies, treepies, nutcrackers, and ground jays. Corvids are above average in size among the Passeriformes, and some of the larger species show high levels of intelligence.

- White-necked crow, Corvus leucognaphalus (Ex)

== Swallows ==
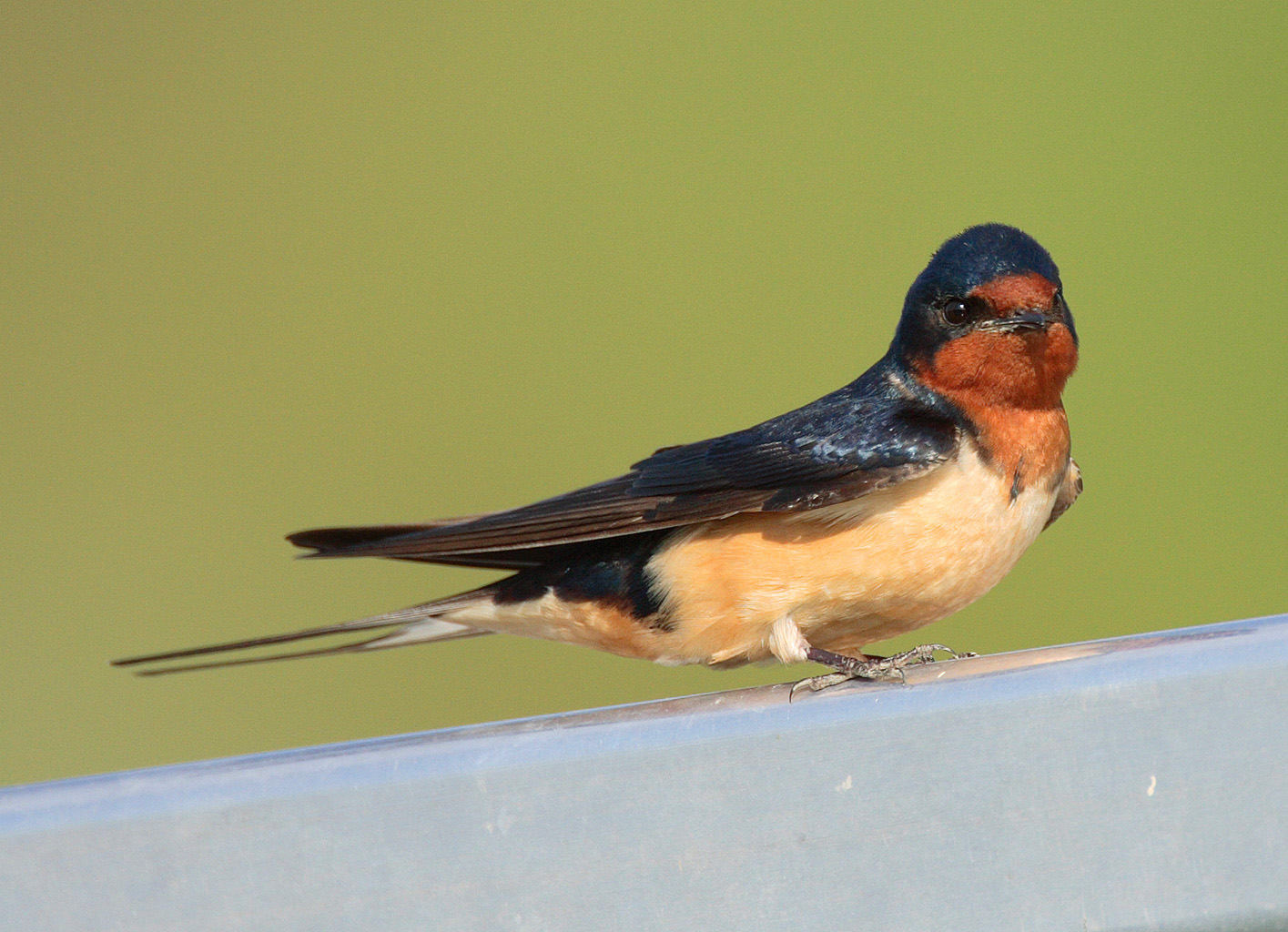
Barn swallow, species from this family are known as golondrinas in Puerto Rico.

Order: Passeriformes Family: Hirundinidae

The family Hirundinidae is adapted to aerial feeding. They have a slender streamlined body, long pointed wings, and a short bill with a wide gape. The feet are adapted to perching rather than walking, and the front toes are partially joined at the base.

- Bank swallow, Riparia riparia
- Tree swallow, Tachycineta bicolor (A)
- Violet-green swallow, Tachycineta thalassina (A)
- Northern rough-winged swallow, Stelgidopteryx serripennis (A)
- Brown-chested martin, Progne tapera (A)
- Purple martin, Progne subis (A)
- Cuban martin, Progne cryptoleuca (A)
- Caribbean martin, Progne dominicensis
- Barn swallow, Hirundo rustica
- Cliff swallow, Petrochelidon pyrrhonota (A)
- Cave swallow, Petrochelidon fulva

== Waxwings ==
Order: Passeriformes Family: Bombycillidae

The waxwings are a group of birds with soft silky plumage and unique red tips to some of the wing feathers. In the Bohemian and cedar waxwings, these tips look like sealing wax and give the group its name. These are arboreal birds of northern forests. They live on insects in summer and berries in winter.

- Cedar waxwing, Bombycilla cedrorum (A)

== Mockingbirds and thrashers ==
Northern mockingbird, commonly known as ruiseñor in Puerto Rico.

Order: Passeriformes Family: Mimidae

The mimids are a family of passerine birds that includes thrashers, mockingbirds, tremblers, and the New World catbirds. These birds are notable for their vocalization, especially their remarkable ability to mimic a wide variety of birds and other sounds heard outdoors. The species tend towards dull grays and browns in their appearance.

- Gray catbird, Dumetella carolinensis (A)
- Pearly-eyed thrasher, Margarops fuscatus
- Bahama mockingbird, Mimus gundlachii (A)
- Northern mockingbird, Mimus polyglottos

== Starlings ==
Order: Passeriformes Family: Sturnidae

Starlings and mynas are small to medium-sized Old World passerine birds with strong feet. Their flight is strong and direct and they are very gregarious. Their preferred habitat is fairly open country, and they eat insects and fruit. Plumage is typically dark with a metallic sheen.

- Common hill myna, Gracula religiosa (I)
- European starling, Sturnus vulgaris (I) (A)
- Common myna, Acridotheres tristis (I)

== Thrushes and allies ==
Order: Passeriformes Family: Turdidae

The Thrushes are a group of passerine birds that occur mainly but not exclusively in the Old World. They are plump, soft plumaged, small to medium-sized insectivores or sometimes omnivores, often feeding on the ground. Many have attractive songs.

- Veery, Catharus fuscescens (A)
- Gray-cheeked thrush, Catharus minimus (A)
- Bicknell's thrush, Catharus bicknelli (A)
- Swainson's thrush, Catharus ustulatus (A)
- Wood thrush, Hylocichla mustelina (A)
- American robin, Turdus migratorius (A)
- Eastern red-legged thrush, Turdus ardosiaceus

== Old World flycatchers ==
Order: Passeriformes Family: Muscicapidae

Old World flycatchers are a large group of small passerine birds native to the Old World. They are mainly small arboreal insectivores. The appearance of these birds is highly varied, but they mostly have weak songs and harsh calls.

- Northern wheatear, Oenanthe oenanthe (A)

== Weavers and allies ==
Order: Passeriformes Family: Ploceidae

Weavers are a group of small passerine birds related to the finches. These are seed-eating birds with rounded conical bills, most of which breed in sub-Saharan Africa, with fewer species in tropical Asia. Weavers get their name from the large woven nests many species make. They are gregarious birds which often breed colonially.

- Northern red bishop, Euplectes franciscanus (I)
- Yellow-crowned bishop, Euplectes afer (I)

== Indigobirds ==
Order: Passeriformes Family: Viduidae

The Viduidae is a family of small passerine birds native to Africa that includes indigobirds and whydahs. All species are brood parasites which lay their eggs in the nests of estrildid finches. Species usually have black or indigo predominating in their plumage.

- Pin-tailed whydah, Vidua macroura (I)

== Waxbills and allies ==
Order: Passeriformes Family: Estrildidae

The estrildid finches are small passerine birds of the Old World tropics and Australasia. They are gregarious and often colonial seed eaters with short thick but pointed bills. They are all similar in structure and habits, but have wide variation in plumage colors and patterns.

- Bronze mannikin, Spermestes cucullata (I)
- Indian silverbill, Euodice malabarica (I)
- Java sparrow, Padda oryzivora (I)
- Scaly-breasted munia, Lonchura punctulata (I)
- Tricolored munia, Lonchura malacca (I)
- Chestnut munia, Lonchura atricapilla (I)
- Red avadavat, Amandava amandava (I)
- Orange-cheeked waxbill, Estrilda melpoda (I)
- Black-rumped waxbill, Estrilda troglodytes (I)

== Old World sparrows ==
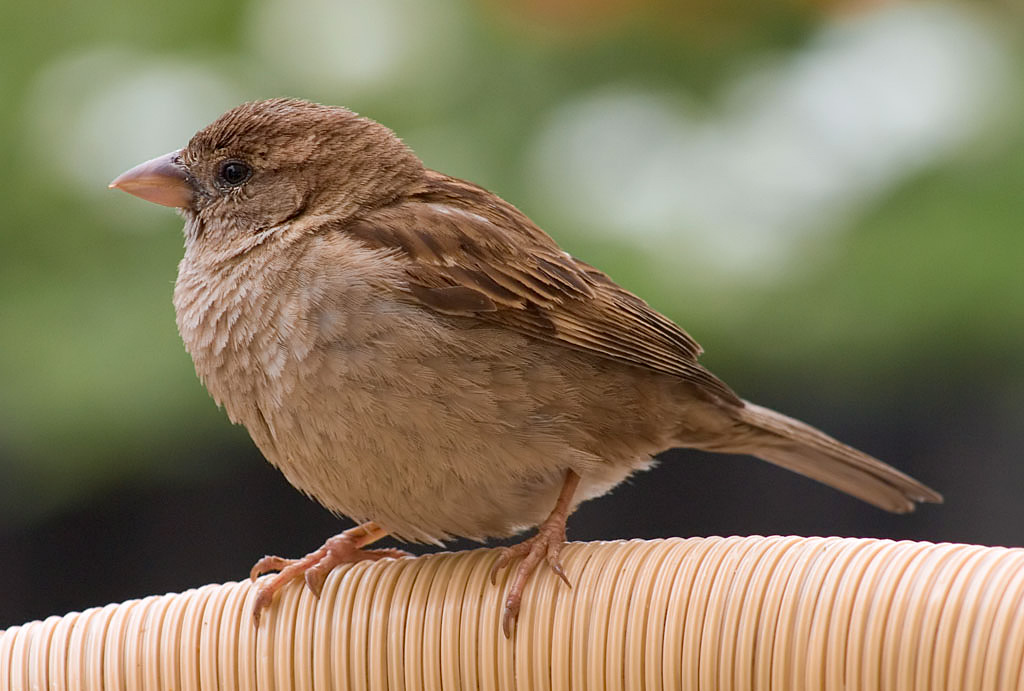
House sparrow, a common species in Puerto Rico's urban areas.

Order: Passeriformes Family: Passeridae

Sparrows are small passerine birds. In general, sparrows tend to be small plump brownish or grayish birds with short tails and short powerful beaks. Sparrows are seed eaters, but they also consume small insects.

- House sparrow, Passer domesticus (I)

== Finches, euphonias, and allies ==
Order: Passeriformes Family: Fringillidae

Finches are seed-eating passerine birds, that are small to moderately large and have a strong beak, usually conical and in some species very large. All have twelve tail feathers and nine primaries. These birds have a bouncing flight with alternating bouts of flapping and gliding on closed wings, and most sing well.

- Puerto Rican euphonia, Chlorophonia sclateri
- Yellow-fronted canary, Crithagra mozambica (I) (A)
- Red siskin, Spinus cucullatus (I)
- Island canary, Serinus canaria (I)

== New World sparrows ==
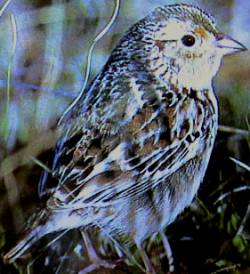
Grasshopper sparrow, a species that commonly occurs in rice fields and pastures.

Order: Passeriformes Family: Passerellidae

Until 2017, these species were considered part of the family Emberizidae. Most of the species are known as sparrows, but these birds are not closely related to the Old World sparrows which are in the family Passeridae. Many of these have distinctive head patterns.

- Grasshopper sparrow, Ammodramus savannarum
- Dark-eyed junco, Junco hyemalis (A)
- White-throated sparrow, Zonotrichia albicollis (A)
- Lincoln's sparrow, Melospiza lincolnii (A)

== Puerto Rican tanager ==
Order: Passeriformes Family: Nesospingidae

This species was formerly classified as a tanager (family Thraupidae) but was placed in its own family in 2017.

- Puerto Rican tanager, Nesospingus speculiferus (E)

== Spindalises ==
Order: Passeriformes Family: Spindalidae

The members of this small family are native to the Greater Antilles. They were formerly classified as tanagers but were placed in their own family in 2017.

- Puerto Rican spindalis, Spindalis portoricensis (E)

== Troupials and allies ==
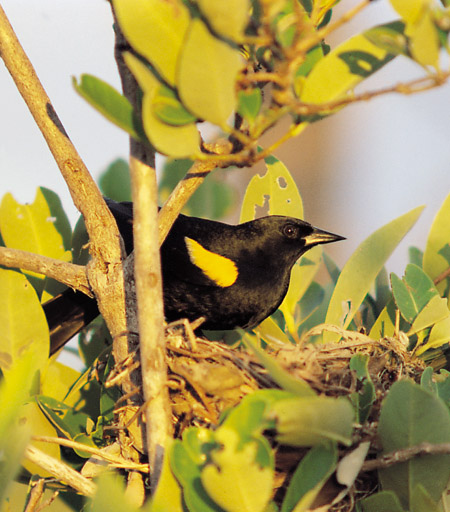
Yellow-shouldered blackbird, an endemic blackbird placed in the United States Fish and Wildlife Service list of endangered species in 1976.

Order: Passeriformes Family: Icteridae

The icterids are a group of small to medium-sized, often colorful passerine birds restricted to the New World and include the grackles, New World blackbirds, and New World orioles. Most species have black as a predominant plumage color, often enlivened by yellow, orange, or red.

- Yellow-headed blackbird, Xanthocephalus xanthocephalus (A)
- Bobolink, Dolichonyx oryzivorus (A)
- Puerto Rican oriole, Icterus portoricensis (E)
- Orchard oriole, Icterus spurius (A)
- Venezuelan troupial, Icterus icterus (I)
- Bullock's oriole, Icterus bullockii (A)
- Baltimore oriole, Icterus galbula (A)
- Red-winged blackbird, Agelaius phoeniceus (A)
- Yellow-shouldered blackbird, Agelaius xanthomus (E)
- Shiny cowbird, Molothrus bonariensis
- Brown-headed cowbird, Molothrus ater (A)
- Great-tailed grackle, Quiscalus mexicanus (A)
- Greater Antillean grackle, Quiscalus niger
- Yellow-hooded blackbird, Chrysomus icterocephalus (A)

== New World warblers ==
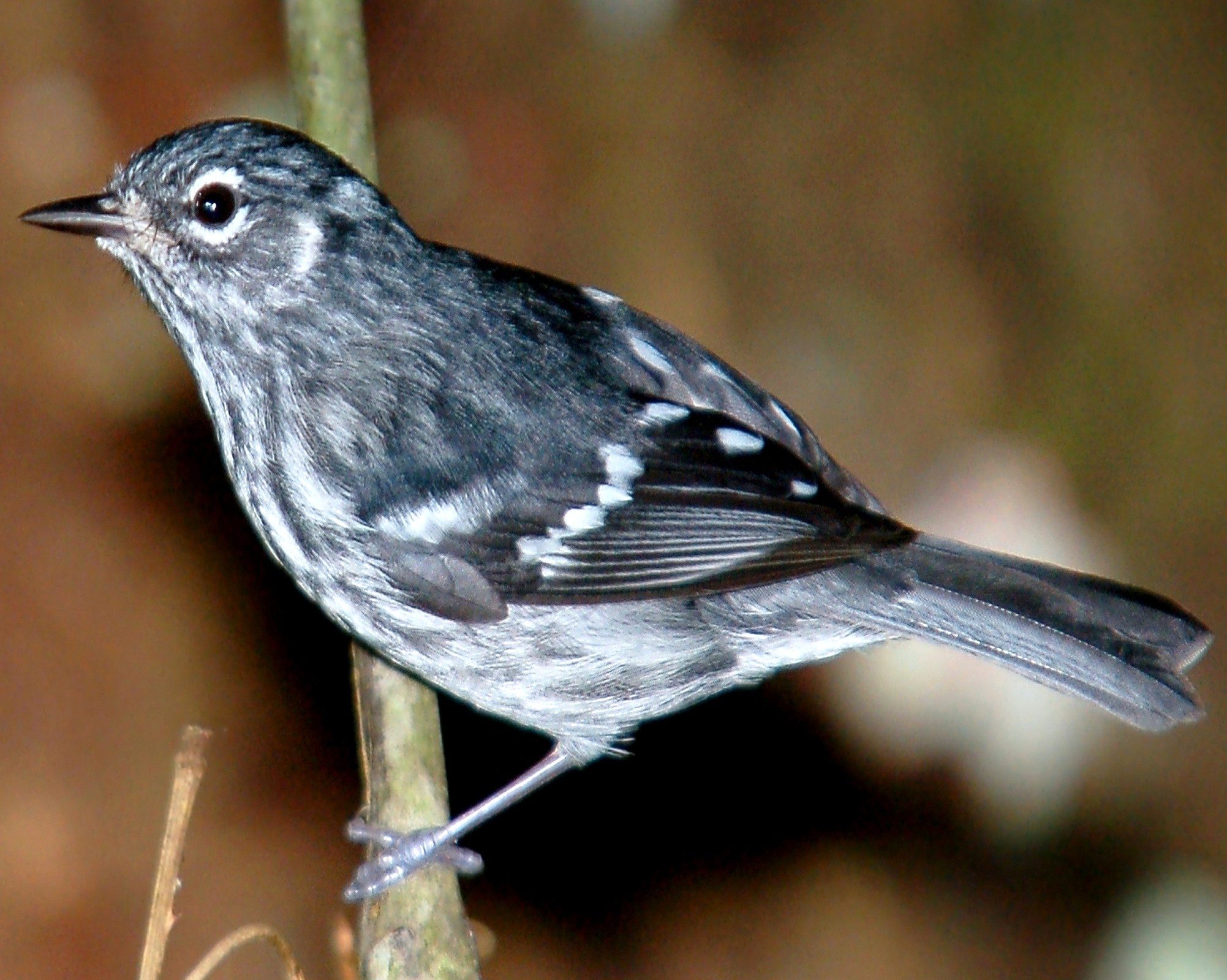
Elfin-woods warbler, the most recently described New World warbler.

Order: Passeriformes Family: Parulidae

The wood-warblers are a group of small often colorful passerine birds restricted to the New World. Most are arboreal, but some are more terrestrial. Most members of this family are insectivores.

- Ovenbird, Seiurus aurocapilla
- Worm-eating warbler, Helmitheros vermivorum (A)
- Louisiana waterthrush, Parkesia motacilla
- Northern waterthrush, Parkesia noveboracensis
- Golden-winged warbler, Vermivora chrysoptera (A)
- Blue-winged warbler, Vermivora cyanoptera (A)
- Black-and-white warbler, Mniotilta varia
- Prothonotary warbler, Protonotaria citrea (A)
- Swainson's warbler, Limnothlypis swainsonii (A)
- Tennessee warbler, Leiothlypis peregrina (A)
- Nashville warbler, Leiothlypis ruficapilla (A)
- Connecticut warbler, Oporornis agilis (A)
- Mourning warbler, Geothlypis philadelphia (A)
- Kentucky warbler, Geothlypis formosa (A)
- Common yellowthroat, Geothlypis trichas
- Elfin-woods warbler, Setophaga angelae (E)
- Hooded warbler, Setophaga citrina (A)
- American redstart, Setophaga ruticilla
- Cape May warbler, Setophaga tigrina
- Cerulean warbler, Setophaga cerulea (A)
- Northern parula, Setophaga americana
- Magnolia warbler, Setophaga magnolia (A)
- Bay-breasted warbler, Setophaga castanea (A)
- Blackburnian warbler, Setophaga fusca (A)
- Yellow warbler, Setophaga petechia
- Chestnut-sided warbler, Setophaga pensylvanica (A)
- Blackpoll warbler, Setophaga striata
- Black-throated blue warbler, Setophaga caerulescens
- Palm warbler, Setophaga palmarum (A)
- Pine warbler, Setophaga pinus (A)
- Yellow-rumped warbler, Setophaga coronata (A)
- Yellow-throated warbler, Setophaga dominica (A)
- Prairie warbler, Setophaga discolor
- Adelaide's warbler, Setophaga adelaidae (E)
- Townsend's warbler, Setophaga townsendi (A)
- Black-throated green warbler, Setophaga virens (A)
- Canada warbler, Cardellina canadensis (A)
- Wilson's warbler, Cardellina pusilla (A)

== Cardinals and allies ==
Order: Passeriformes Family: Cardinalidae

The cardinals are a family of robust, seed-eating birds with strong bills. They are typically associated with open woodland. The sexes usually have distinct plumages.

- Summer tanager, Piranga rubra (A)
- Scarlet tanager, Piranga olivacea (A)
- Rose-breasted grosbeak, Pheucticus ludovicianus (A)
- Blue grosbeak, Passerina caerulea (A)
- Indigo bunting, Passerina cyanea (A)
- Dickcissel, Spiza americana (A)

== Tanagers and allies ==
Order: Passeriformes Family: Thraupidae

The tanagers are a large group of small to medium-sized passerine birds restricted to the New World, mainly in the tropics. Many species are brightly colored. As a family they are omnivorous, but individual species specialize in eating fruits, seeds, insects, or other types of food.

- Red-crested cardinal, Paroaria coronata (I)
- Saffron finch, Sicalis flaveola (I)
- Bananaquit, Coereba flaveola
- Yellow-faced grassquit, Tiaris olivaceus
- Puerto Rican bullfinch, Melopyrrha portoricensis (E)
- Lesser Antillean bullfinch, Loxigilla noctis (A)
- Black-faced grassquit, Melanospiza bicolor

== See also ==
- Fauna of Puerto Rico
- List of birds
- List of birds of North America
- List of endemic fauna of Puerto Rico
- List of Vieques birds
- El Toro Wilderness
