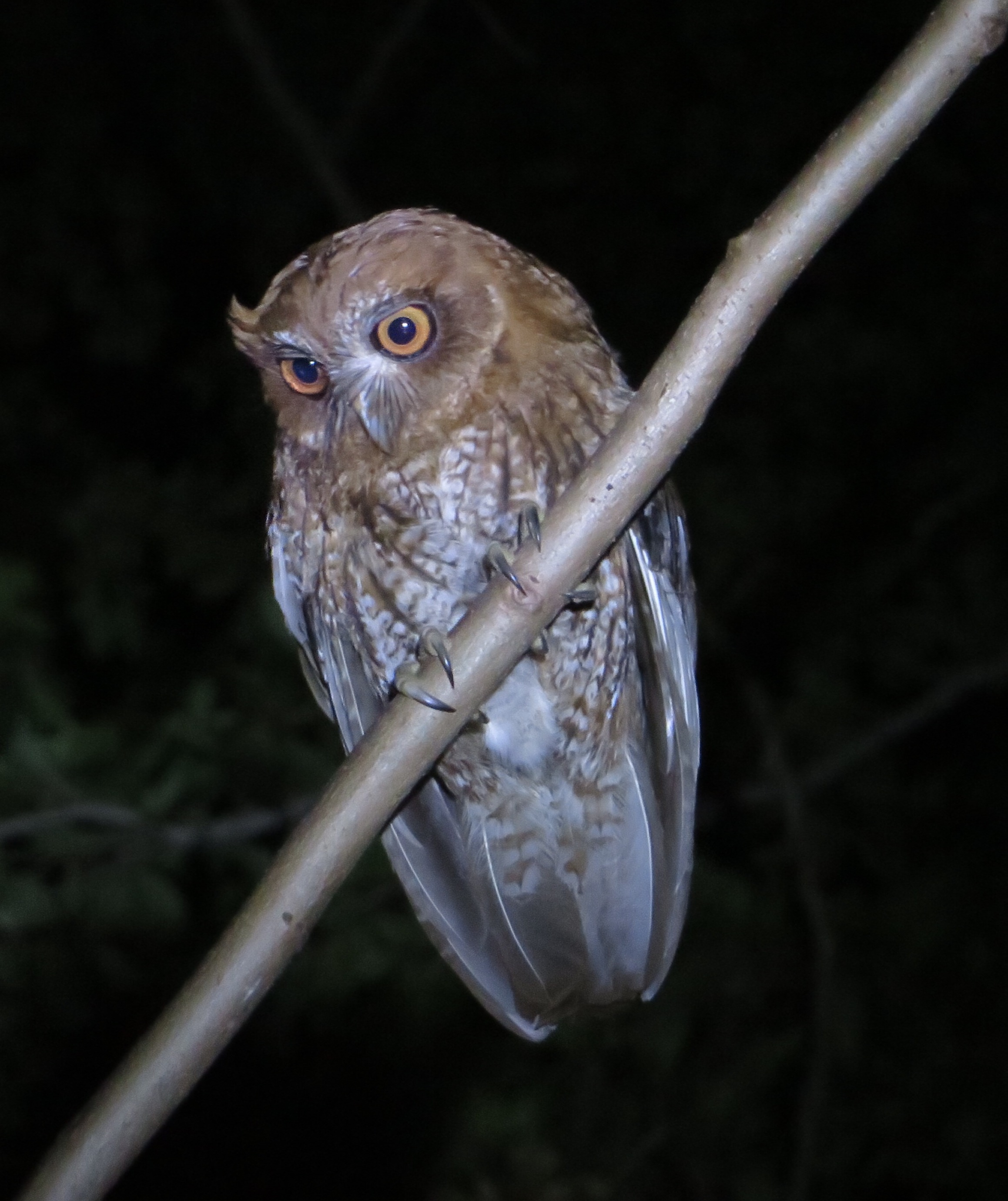
- Gymnasio nudipes over a Delonix regia tree
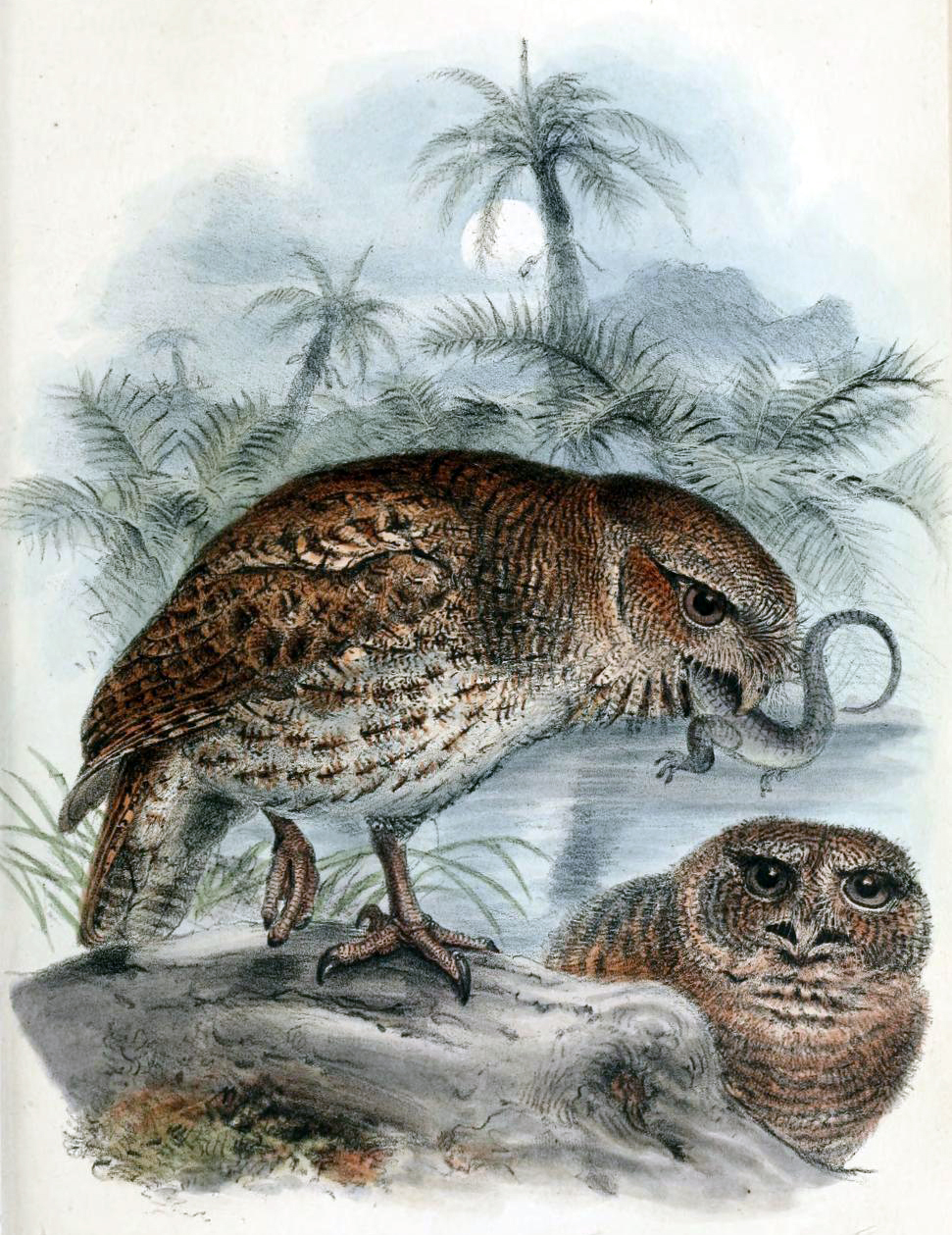
- Gymnasio nudipes newtoni

Conservation status
- Least Concern (IUCN 3.1)
- CITES Appendix II

Scientific classification
- Kingdom: Animalia
- Phylum: Chordata
- Class: Aves
- Order: Strigiformes
- Family: Strigidae
- Genus: Gymnasio; Bonaparte, 1854
- Species: G. nudipes

Binomial name
- Gymnasio nudipes (Daudin, 1800)

Subspecies
- G. n. nudipes G. n. newtoni

= Puerto Rican owl =

Species of owl

The Puerto Rican owl (Gymnasio nudipes) or múcaro común (Spanish via Taino), formerly known as the Puerto Rican screech owl, is a mid-sized "typical owl" in subfamily Striginae. It is endemic to the archipelago of Puerto Rico though it formerly also inhabited the Virgin Islands.

== Taxonomy and systematics ==
The Puerto Rican owl was formally described in 1800 by the French zoologist François Marie Daudin from specimens collected in Puerto Rico. He coined the binomial name Strix nudipes. The species was subsequently placed either in the genus Otus with the scops owls or in Megascops with the screech owls. It is now the only species assigned to the genus Gymnasio that was introduced in 1854 specifically for the Puerto Rican owl by Charles Lucien Bonaparte. The genus name combines the Ancient Greek gumnos meaning "bare" or "naked" with the Latin asio, a type of eared owl. The specific epithet nudipes is Latin meaning "bare-footed".

A species endemic to the Virgin Islands was described in 1860 by George Newbold Lawrence under the binomial Gymnoglaux newtoni. This is treated as a subspecies of the Puerto Rican owl (Gymnasio nudipes newtoni), but its identity as a separate subspecies has been questioned because it is based on minor differences in plumage. The taxon is probably extinct as surveys of the Virgin Islands conducted since 1995 have failed to detect any Puerto Rican owls.

A molecular phylogenetic study of the owls published in 2019 found that the Puerto Rican owl is a sister species to the flammulated owl (Psiloscops flammeolus), a migratory species in North America.

== Description ==
The Puerto Rican owl is 20 to 25 cm (7.9 to 9.8 in) long with a wing length of 154 to 171 mm (6.1 to 6.7 in). It weighs 100 to 170 g (3.5 to 6.0 oz), with females being slightly heavier than males. It has a rounded head with no "ear" tufts. It has three color morphs; the brown one predominates, the rufous one is fairly common, and the gray one is rare. The brown morph has brown upperparts with irregular paler brown bars and vermiculation. The tail is also brown with paler vermiculation. The wing coverts have some whitish spots. Its facial discs have narrow light and dark brown bars; the supercilium and lores are white. The underparts are mostly white with much brown or dusky streaking, barring, and vermiculation. The belly and undertail coverts are usually plain white. The legs are not feathered, which is unusual in owls, and led to another former common name, the Puerto Rican bare-legged owl. The eye is brown, the bill greenish yellow, and the legs and feet pale brown to grayish yellow. The rufous morph replaces the brown with pale reddish brown or ochre buff. Putative subspecies G. n. newtoni has somewhat paler upperparts and less heavily streaked underparts than the nominate.

== Distribution and habitat ==
The Puerto Rican owl is found throughout the main island of Puerto Rico. The putative subspecies G. n. newtoni certainly occurred on St. Croix, St. John, and St. Thomas in the Virgin Islands but has not been positively recorded there since the mid 1800s. It possibly occurred on other Virgin Islands and on Vieques and Culebra, but no documentation supports those assertions. On Puerto Rico its primary natural habitat is humid lowland forest but it also occurs in dry forest and urban areas. "Any small territory with available nest cavities is ideal for this species."

== Behavior ==
=== Movement ===
The Puerto Rican owl is resident throughout its range.

=== Feeding ===
The Puerto Rican owl is a nocturnal hunter. Its primary prey is large arthropods such as cockroaches, grasshoppers, and moths. It also regularly eats small vertebrates such as frogs, lizards, rodents, and birds.

=== Breeding ===
The Puerto Rican owl's breeding season spans from April to June. It nests in cavities in trees and lays a clutch of up to three white eggs. Little else is known about its breeding phenology.

=== Vocalization ===
The Puerto Rican owl's territorial song is "a short, relatively deep, somewhat guttural, toad-like quavering trill...rrurrrrrrr." It also makes "a soft cackling gu-gu and "a loud coo-coo"; the latter call provides the local colloquial name "cuckoo bird".

== Status ==
The IUCN has assessed the Puerto Rican owl as being of Least Concern. Though it has a relatively small range, its population exceeds 10,000 mature individuals and is believed to be stable. No specific threats have been identified. Its disappearance from the Virgin Islands is thought to have happened because the native forests there were mostly cleared by the end of the nineteenth century.

== Gallery ==
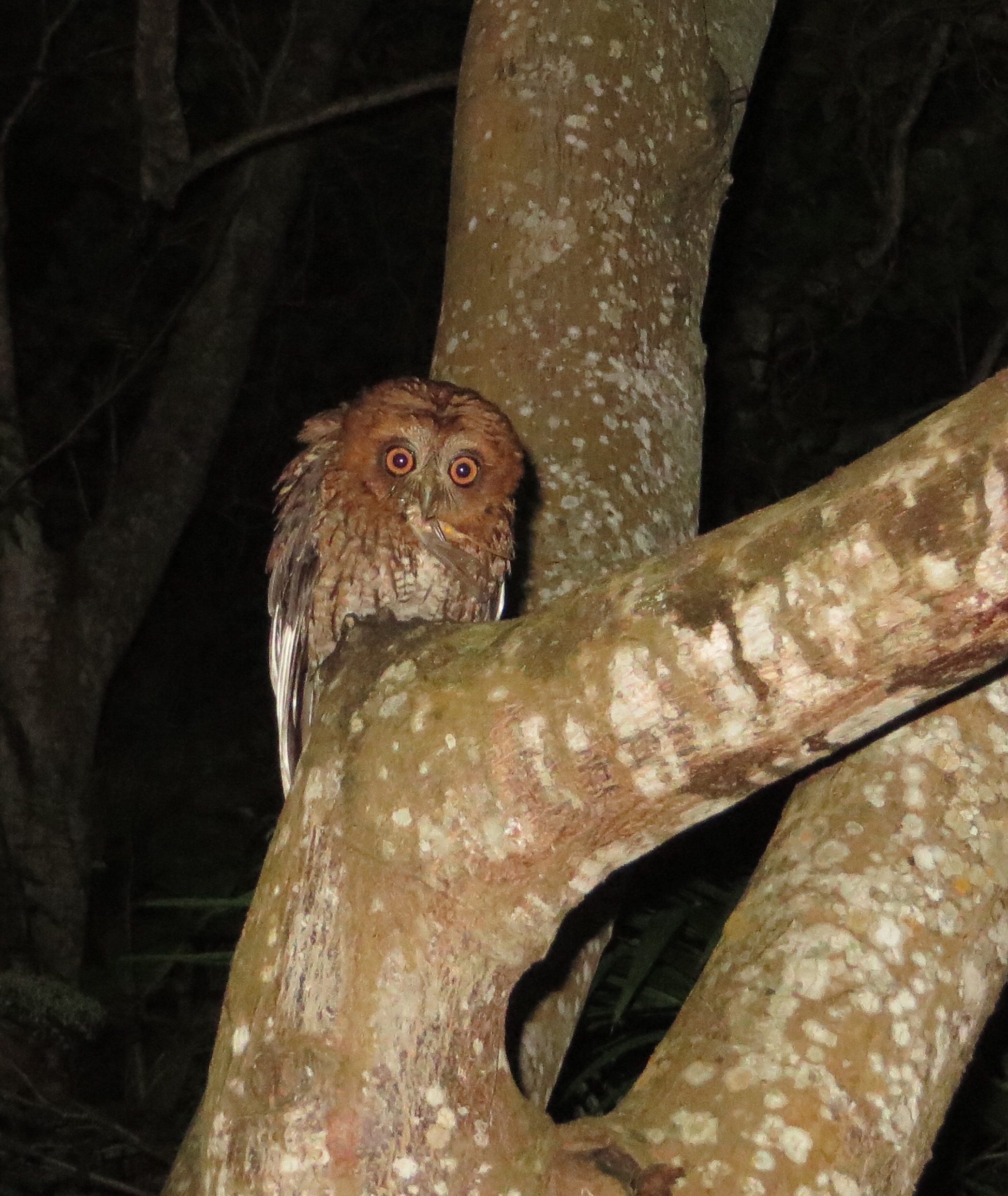
An adult at the western municipality of Aguada

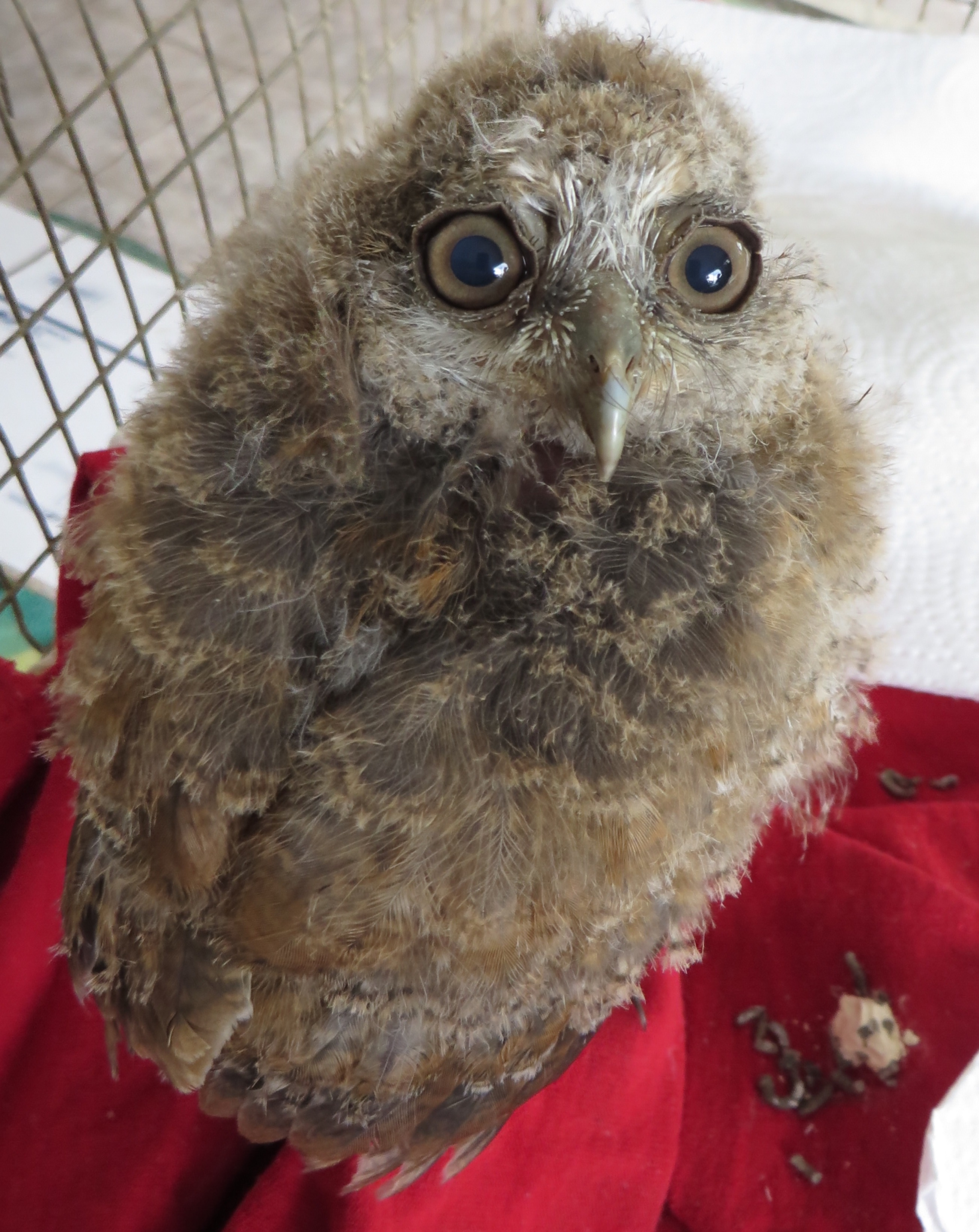
An owlet

== See also ==
- Fauna of Puerto Rico
- List of birds of Puerto Rico
- List of endemic fauna of Puerto Rico
- List of birds of Vieques
- El Toro Wilderness
