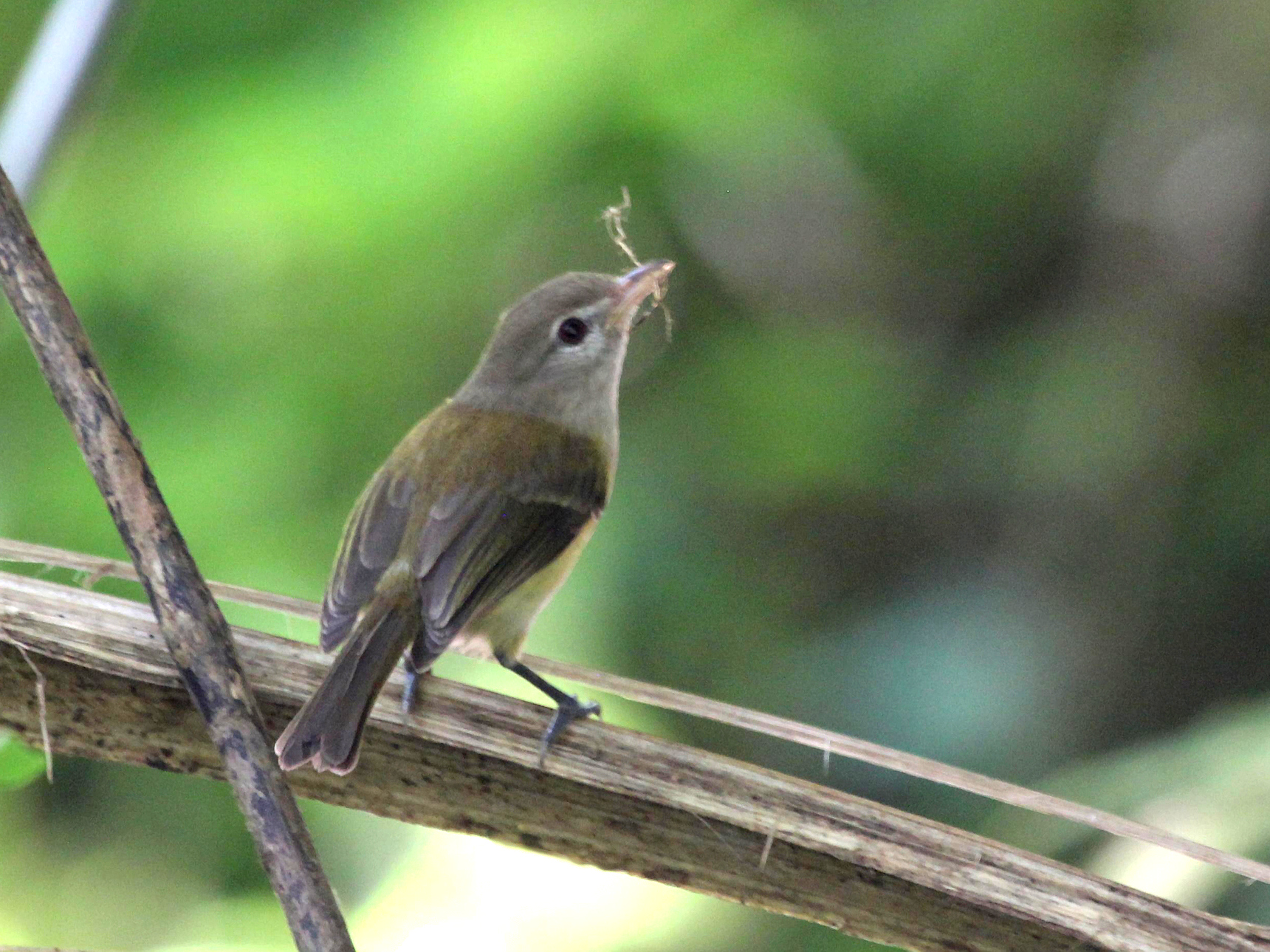

Conservation status
- Least Concern (IUCN 3.1)

Scientific classification
- Kingdom: Animalia
- Phylum: Chordata
- Class: Aves
- Order: Passeriformes
- Family: Vireonidae
- Genus: Vireo
- Species: V. latimeri

Binomial name
- Vireo latimeri Baird, 1866

= Puerto Rican vireo =

Species of bird

The Puerto Rican vireo (Vireo latimeri) is a small bird endemic to the archipelago of Puerto Rico and one of the 31 species belonging to the genus Vireo of the family Vireonidae. Its local name is bien-te-veo ("see-you-well", after the call), not to be confused with the unrelated great kiskadee - also known as bien-te-veo - which is found elsewhere.

The Puerto Rican vireo has a gray head, a white breast and a yellowish belly. The species measures, on average, 12 cm (4.72 in) and weighs from 11 to 12 grams (0.388–0.423 oz).

The Puerto Rican vireo is found in various forested areas of all elevations in Puerto Rico, in wet and dry forests, and mangroves. The birds have been found to be living in the various shade coffee plantations.

Breeding starts from March to July where they lay clutches of 2–3 eggs, that are palish pink with brownish brown spot. Typically, the vireos usually only have enough resources to sustain one chick, and the parents share equal responsibility in caring for the chick by gathering resources and defending the nest from other birds.

An insectivore, the species's diet consists of grasshoppers, caterpillars, cicadas, beetles and aphids and is complemented with spiders, anoles, and berries.

From 1973 until at least 1996, the species suffered a population decline in the Guánica State Forest. The primary reason for this decline was brood parasitism by the shiny cowbird (Molothrus bonariensis).

A study from the 1973–1996 measured the survival rates of Puerto Rican Vreo, by using mist netting techniques in Guiana forest which is 4000 hectares. Since there were no captures in the six of the past ten years this was evident enough to suggest a 5% decrease. Seven nets showed a decrease of from 27 in 1989 to eight captures in 1995. The original net line had a survival rate of 0.68, between 1973–1990, to 0.61 when adding 6 more years to 1996. There was an analysis done which showed after 1994 there was 0.54 annual survival rate. This suggests that either the Vireo emigrated or suffered morality. A leading cause of this was Shiny Cowbirds after being introduced had a severe reaction to the vireo population, of 83% of nests being parasited, leading to 82% of reduction in fledglings. This was evident as the main problem because of no negative decrease in other insectivore birds such as Puerto Rican Flycatcher(Myiarchus antillarum) and the Adelaide's Warblerr (Dendroica adelaidae).

Reasons for population decline are competition over nesting spots with other birds, The shiny cowbird commonly lays it's eggs in the Vireo's nest. As well as, animals brought to hunt rats like mongooses, and cats commonly all threaten their existence. Deforestation and removal of shade coffee plantations also destroys the local ecosystem displacing the vireos. The birds population has been declining for 20 years.

Annual survival rates for the Puerto Rican vireos are 0.74, and the survival rate for the first fledging was 0.40. The longevity record for the Puerto Rican Vireo is 13 years and 2 months this was found through banding and recapturing. 51 males, 14 females, and 13 fletchings, and 10 of unknown sex were the sample and the recapture rate for males was 0.92. Another study conducted after the Hurricane Georges, where they found that overall nest survival was 0.932. They found a 26% decrease in density of territorial males observed the post hurricane year. There was a return rate of 39% of color marked adults the year of the hurricane and 72% the year without the hurricane.

A study was done on genetic diversity of different vireo species, by using random ampifiled polymorphic DNA markers, they found that White-Eyed Vireo(Vireo griseus) had much higher genetic diversity with 67% being polymorphic. The island species like Puerto Rican Vireo(V. latimeri) had 38%, Jamaican Vireo (V. modestus) had 34%, and lastly the Blue Mountain Vireo (V. osburni) had 32%.

External audio
- Bird Call
- Click here to listen to the Puerto Rican Vireo bien-te-veo call

== See also ==
- Fauna of Puerto Rico
- List of birds of Puerto Rico
- List of endemic fauna of Puerto Rico
- List of Puerto Rican birds
- List of Vieques birds
- El Toro Wilderness
