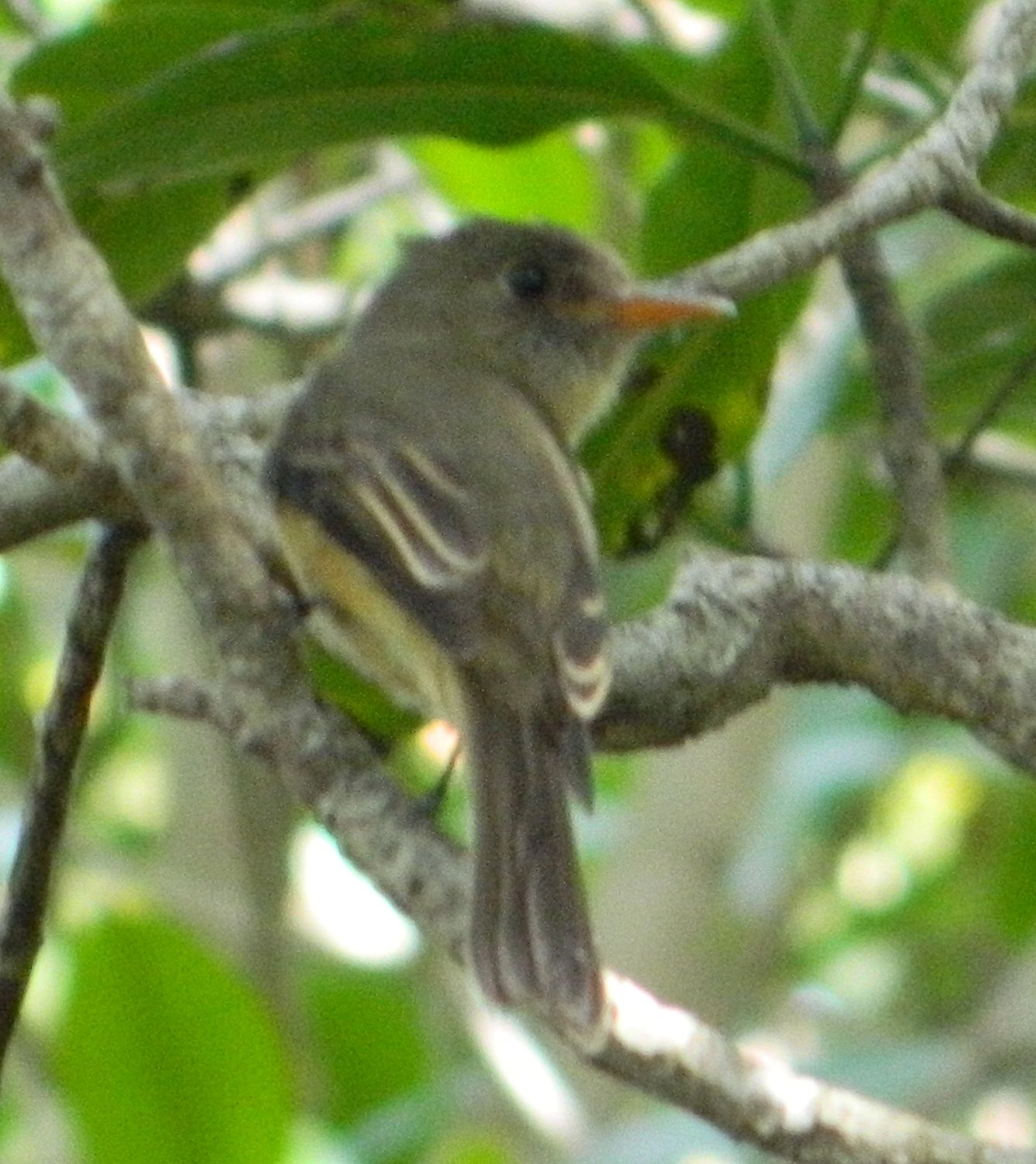

Conservation status
- Least Concern (IUCN 3.1)

Scientific classification
- Kingdom: Animalia
- Phylum: Chordata
- Class: Aves
- Order: Passeriformes
- Family: Tyrannidae
- Genus: Contopus
- Species: C. latirostris

Binomial name
- Contopus latirostris (Verreaux, 1866)

= Lesser Antillean pewee =

Species of bird

The Lesser Antillean pewee (Contopus latirostris) is a species of bird in the family Tyrannidae, the tyrant flycatchers. It is found in Dominica, Guadeloupe, Martinique, Puerto Rico, and Saint Lucia. There are also scattered records on Saint Kitts.

== Taxonomy and systematics ==
Worldwide and regional taxonomic systems assign the Lesser Antillean pewee three subspecies, the nominate C. l. latirostris (Verreaux, 1866), C. l. blancoi (Cabanis, 1875), and C. l. brunneicapillus (Lawrence, 1878). However, some authors have treated each as a separate species. Some of them call C. l. latirostris the Saint Lucia pewee (C. oberi) and C. l. blancoi the Puerto Rican pewee (C. portoricensis). The Clements taxonomy recognizes one species but within it highlights the nominate subspecies as the "Lesser Antillean pewee (St. Lucia)", C. l. blancoi as the "Lesser Antillean pewee (Puerto Rico)", and C. l. brunneicapillus as the "Lesser Antillean pewee (Lesser Antilles)".

== Description ==
All three subspecies of the Lesser Antillean pewee are about 15 cm (5.9 in) long. Within each subspecies the sexes are alike. Adults of the nominate subspecies have a dark sooty brown crown, an olive-brown face with a fulvous tinge, and olive-brown upperparts with a cinnamon tinge on the rump and uppertail coverts. Their tail is dark grayish brown with pale grayish brown or buffy tips on the feathers and light grayish brown on the feather edges. Their wings are mostly dusky with pale cinnamon buff or grayish buff edges on the secondaries. Their underparts are cinnamon tawny or dull tawny ochraceous. They have a brown iris, a horn brown maxilla, a whitish mandible, and dusky brown legs and feet.

Adults of subspecies C. l. blancoi have a dark sooty olive to sooty blackish crown, deep olive head and upperparts, and a dusky grayish brown tail with some olive on the feather edges. Their wings are mostly dusky with thin paler edges near the tips of the coverts and pale brownish buff edges on the secondaries. Their underparts are mostly deep brownish buff with paler undertail coverts and a dark olive shade on the breast and sides. They have a brown iris, a brownish black or blackish brown maxilla, a pale mandible usually with a dusky tip, and dusky brown or blackish legs and feet.

Adults of subspecies C. l. brunneicapillus have a dark sooty brown to sooty black crown and a dark brownish olive to olive-brown face and upperparts with a paler and browner rump and uppertail coverts. Their tail is deep grayish brown with pale grayish brown or olive on the outer webs of the feathers. Their wings are mostly dusky with grayish brown or olive tips on the coverts and pale brownish buffy edges on the secondaries. Their chin and throat are buffy white or buffy grayish white and their underparts mostly brownish buffy with a strong grayish olive cast on the breast and sides. They have a brown iris, a dusky brown maxilla, a pale mandible usually with a dusky tip, and dusky brown or brownish black legs and feet.

== Distribution and habitat ==
The nominate subspecies of the Lesser Antillean pewee is found on St. Lucia, where it primarily inhabits montane forest. Subspecies C. l. blancoi is found on Puerto Rico, though it is rare in the eastern third of the island. It also primarily inhabits montane forest. Both are also found in lower elevation forest, wooded hills, and coffee plantations and locally in semi-arid scrublands and coastal mangroves. C. l. brunneicapillus is found on Guadeloupe, Dominica, and Martinique. There it inhabits the same variety of habitat but does not appear to favor any particular one. The species is found in the tropical zone from sea level to about 900 m (3,000 ft) of elevation. The species also is recorded occasionally in the mountains of St. Kitts but it is not known if they are vagrants or remnants of a formerly more robust population.

== Behavior ==
=== Movement ===
The Lesser Antillean pewee is a year-round resident.

=== Feeding ===
The Lesser Antillean pewee feeds mostly on insects and includes a small amount of fruit in its diet. It sits erect on a perch low to the ground, usually at the edge of an open area within forest, and captures prey in mid-air with sallies from it ("hawking"). It has been observed following mixed-species feeding flocks in montane forest.

=== Breeding ===
The Lesser Antillean pewee breeds from March to June. Its nest is an open cup made from mosses, lichen, leaves, and other fine plant material. It typically has pieces of bark on the outside and is built on twigs. The clutch is two eggs that are cream with dark reddish-brown spots. The incubation period, time to fledging, and details of parental care are not known.

=== Vocalization ===
The Lesser Antillean pewee's vocalizations are "an emphatic pree-e-e, or a high-pitched peet-peet-peet-peet-peet.

== Status ==
The IUCN has assessed the Lesser Antillean pewee as being of Least Concern. Its population size is not known and is believed to be decreasing. No immediate threats have been identified. "Lesser Antillean Pewee has been recorded in both wet and dry wooded and scrub habitats, so maintaining a diverse range of habitat is important for this species."

== See also ==
- Fauna of Puerto Rico
- List of birds of Puerto Rico
- List of endemic fauna of Puerto Rico
- List of Puerto Rican birds
- List of Vieques birds
- El Toro Wilderness
