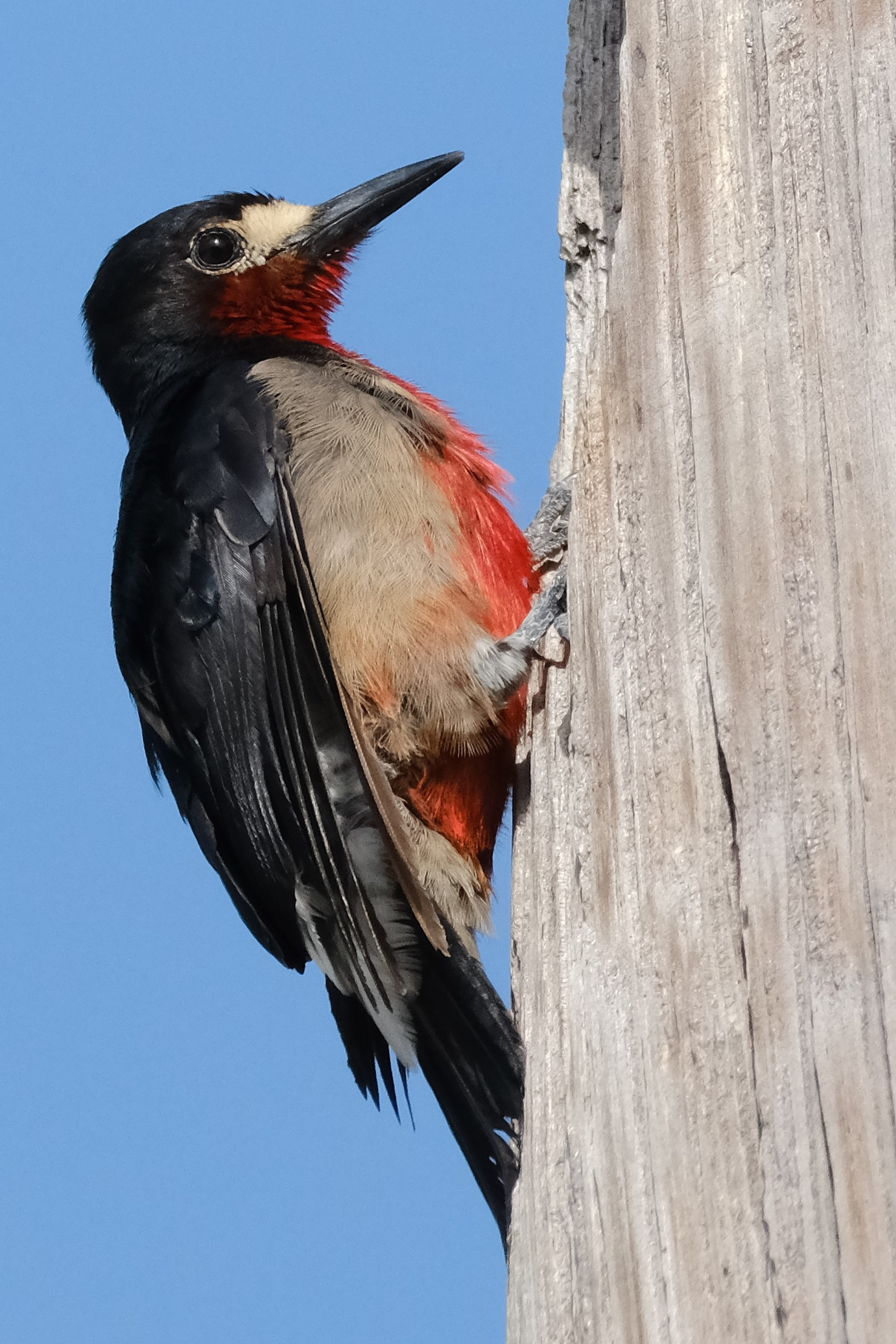

Conservation status
- Least Concern (IUCN 3.1)

Scientific classification
- Kingdom: Animalia
- Phylum: Chordata
- Class: Aves
- Order: Piciformes
- Family: Picidae
- Genus: Melanerpes
- Species: M. portoricensis

Binomial name
- Melanerpes portoricensis (F. Daudin, 1803)

= Puerto Rican woodpecker =

Species of bird

The Puerto Rican woodpecker (Melanerpes portoricensis) is the only woodpecker endemic to the archipelago of Puerto Rico and is one of the five species of the genus Melanerpes that occur in the Antilles. Furthermore, it is the only resident species of the family Picidae in Puerto Rico. The species is common on the main island of Puerto Rico and rare on the island of Vieques.

== Description ==
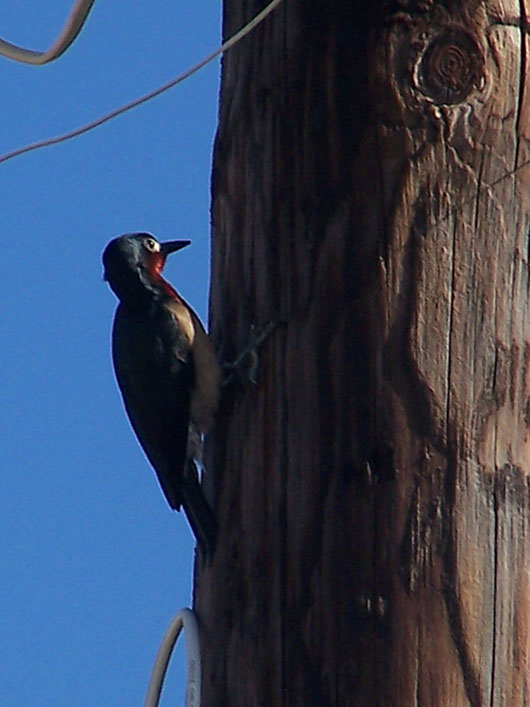
Puerto Rican woodpecker.

The Puerto Rican woodpecker has a black body and a bright red throat and breast. It has a white patch that runs across the head from eye to eye. Its flanks and lower body have a light tangerine coloration. As with the majority of birds sexual dimorphism is present in this species. The males' throat and breast are more brightly colored than the females' with females tending to be all-around duller in coloration. There is also a substantial (~18%) difference in bill length between sexes.

Also males are slightly bigger than females. Its average weight is 56.0 grams. Its body length varies between 23 and 27 centimetres.

== Distribution ==
The Puerto Rican woodpecker is a common and widely distributed species in Puerto Rico, mainly occurring in forests, coffee plantations, mangroves, palm tree groves, parks and gardens. Besides occurring in Puerto Rico it once inhabited the island of St. Croix. This stems from the fact that during the Pleistocene epoch Puerto Rico, Vieques, Culebra, St. Croix and the other Virgin Islands constituted a single landmass. It is believed that at this time the species extended its range to St. Croix and Vieques.

== Behavior ==
The Puerto Rican woodpecker is said to resemble the behavior and structure of the North American red-headed woodpecker (Melanerpes erythrocephalus). Like the majority of woodpeckers this species uses its bill to drill holes in trunks in search of prey. The principal component of its diet are insects such as ants, beetle larvae and others. Fruits are also important, composing one-quarter of its diet. Rarely it may eat scorpions, geckos and coquís. Females lay from 1 to 6 white eggs in cavities carved by males. The nests of M. portoricensis are used by other Puerto Rican endemic birds such as the Puerto Rican flycatcher (Myiarchus antillarum) and the yellow-shouldered blackbird (Agelaius xanthomus).

== See also ==
- Fauna of Puerto Rico
- List of birds of Puerto Rico
- List of endemic fauna of Puerto Rico
- List of Puerto Rican birds
- List of Vieques birds
- El Toro Wilderness
