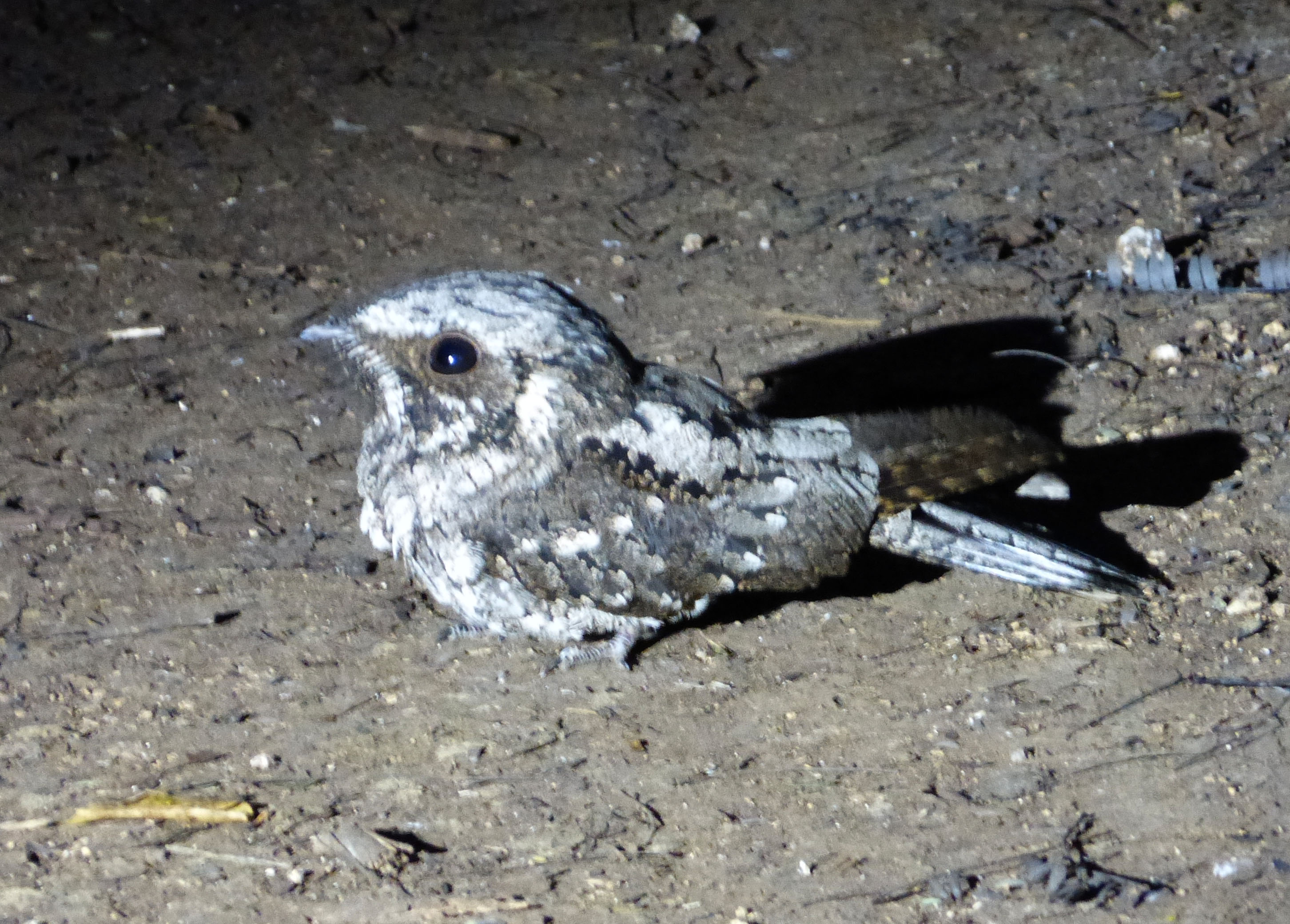

Conservation status
- Least Concern (IUCN 3.1)

Scientific classification
- Kingdom: Animalia
- Phylum: Chordata
- Class: Aves
- Order: Caprimulgiformes
- Family: Caprimulgidae
- Genus: Antrostomus
- Species: A. cubanensis

Binomial name
- Antrostomus cubanensis Lawrence, 1860

Synonyms
- Caprimulgus cubanensis

= Cuban nightjar =

Species of bird

The Cuban nightjar (Antrostomus cubanensis), sometimes also Greater Antillean nightjar, is a species of nightjar in the family Caprimulgidae. It is endemic to Cuba.

== Taxonomy and systematics ==
The Cuban nightjar was originally described as Antrostomus cubanensis; the genus was later lumped into genus Caprimulgus and still later restored as a separate genus. The International Ornithological Committee (IOC), BirdLife International's Handbook of the Birds of the World (HBW), and the Clements taxonomy consider it a species. According to them the Cuban nightjar has two subspecies, the nominate A. c. cubanensis and A. c. insulaepinorum. The American Ornithological Society (AOS) considers those two subspecies and the Hispaniolan nightjar to be subspecies of the Greater Antillean nightjar.

== Description ==
The Cuban nightjar's subspecies A. c. cubanensis is 25 to 29.5 cm (9.8 to 12 in) long. Males weigh approximately 76 g (2.7 oz) and females 70 g (2.5 oz). Their upperparts are dark brown speckled with grayish buff, pale buff, and grayish brown. The tail is brown and the three outer pairs of feathers are tipped with white (male) or buff (female). The innermost pair has grayish brown chevrons. The wings are brown with spots, bars, and mottling of lighter shades. The face is tawny with dark brown speckles, the chin and throat dark brown with cinnamon speckles, the breast dark brown with large spots and smaller speckles of buffy white, and the belly and flanks dark brown with gray speckles. A. c. insulaepinorum is smaller, much darker, and has a shorter tail.

== Distribution and habitat ==
The nominate subspecies of Cuban nightjar is found on the main island of Cuba and most of the small adjoining islands of the archipelago. A. c. insulaepinorum is found only on Isla de la Juventud ("Isle of Youth", formerly the Isle of Pines). They inhabit landscapes described by different authors as "dense scrub", "open woodland and the edges of swamps", and "rather dense forest".

== Behavior ==
=== Feeding ===
The Cuban nightjar is crepuscular and nocturnal. Its prey is insects that it captures in flight, though whether that is during continuous flight or by sallies from a perch or the ground is not known.

=== Breeding ===
The Cuban nightjar breeds between March and July. The usual clutch of two eggs is laid directly on the ground without a nest. Both sexes are believed to incubate the eggs.

=== Vocalization ===
The Cuban nightjar's song is "a rather harsh, buzzy call of one syllable; the pitch rises and falls, with an overall drop in pitch".

== Status ==
The IUCN has assessed the Cuban nightjar as being of Least Concern. Though its population is unknown, it is believed to be decreasing. No immediate threats have been identified. However, "destruction of habitat undoubtably would affect this species, and introduced predators also are a potential threat."
