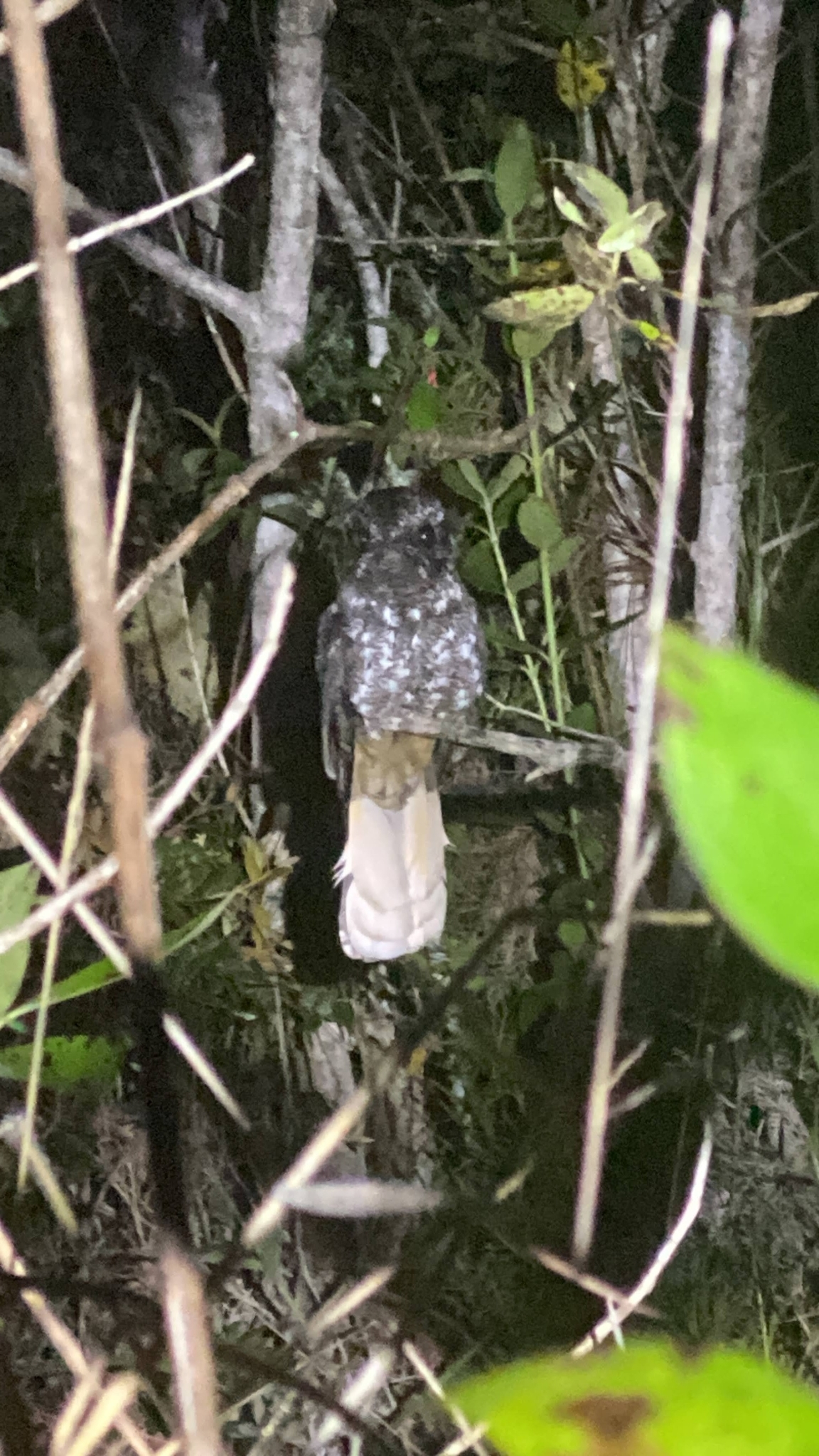

Conservation status
- Least Concern (IUCN 3.1)

Scientific classification
- Kingdom: Animalia
- Phylum: Chordata
- Class: Aves
- Clade: Strisores
- Order: Caprimulgiformes
- Family: Caprimulgidae
- Genus: Antrostomus
- Species: A. ekmani

Binomial name
- Antrostomus ekmani Lönnberg, 1929

= Hispaniolan nightjar =

Species of bird

The Hispaniolan nightjar (Antrostomus ekmani) is a nightjar species endemic to the Caribbean island of Hispaniola, which is shared by the Dominican Republic and Haiti.

== Taxonomy and systematics ==
The Hispaniolan nightjar was originally described as Antrostomus ekmani; the genus was later lumped into genus Caprimulgus and still later restored as a separate genus. The International Ornithological Committee (IOC), BirdLife International's Handbook of the Birds of the World (HBW), and the Clements taxonomy consider it a monotypic species. The American Ornithological Society (AOS) considers it and the two subspecies of the Cuban nightjar (A. cubanensis) to be subspecies of the Greater Antillean nightjar. The species is named for Swedish naturalist Erik Leonard Ekman, who first described the species in the 19th century.

== Description ==
The Hispaniolan nightjar is 26 to 30 cm (10 to 12 in) long. The upperparts are dark brown speckled with grayish buff, pale buff, and grayish brown, and the crown has broad black streaks. The tail is brown and the three outer pairs of feathers are broadly tipped with white (male) or buff (female). The innermost pair has grayish brown chevrons. The wings are brown with spots, bars, and mottling of lighter shades. The face is tawny with dark brown speckles, the chin and throat dark brown with cinnamon speckles, the breast dark brown with large spots and smaller speckles of buffy white, and the belly and flanks dark brown with gray speckles. The Cuban nightjar subspecies endemic to Isla de la Juventud (A. cubensis insulaepinorum) is smaller, much darker, and has a shorter tail than the Hispaniolan nightjar.

== Distribution and habitat ==
The Hispaniolan nightjar is found only on the large island of Hispaniola. It is much more common in the western third of the Dominican Republic than the eastern part of that country, and is very rare in Haiti to the west of the Dominican Republic. It mostly inhabits broadleaf forests at middle elevations, as well as low elevation thorn scrub and higher elevation pine forest. In elevation it ranges up to about 1,825 m (5,990 ft).

== Behavior ==
=== Feeding ===
The Hispaniolan nightjar is crepuscular and nocturnal. Its prey is insects that it captures in flight, though whether that is during continuous flight or by sallies from a perch or the ground is not known.

=== Breeding ===
The Hispaniolan nightjar breeds between April and July. The usual clutch of two eggs is laid directly on the ground without a nest. Both sexes are believed to incubate the eggs.

=== Vocalization ===
The Hispaniolan nightjar's song is "a rather harsh, buzzy call of one syllable" that starts with a click and rises in pitch. Its apparent disturbance call is "low-pitched, brief calls, paraphrased as quat…quat…quat…".

== Status ==
The IUCN has assessed the Hispaniolan nightjar as being of Least Concern. Though its population is unknown, it is believed to be stable, and no immediate threats have been identified. However, "destruction of habitat undoubtably would affect this species, and introduced predators also are a potential threat."
