= Greater Antillean nightjar =

The Greater Antillean nightjar has been split into the following two species:

- Cuban nightjar (Antrostomus cubanensis)
- Hispaniolan nightjar (Antrostomus ekmani)
