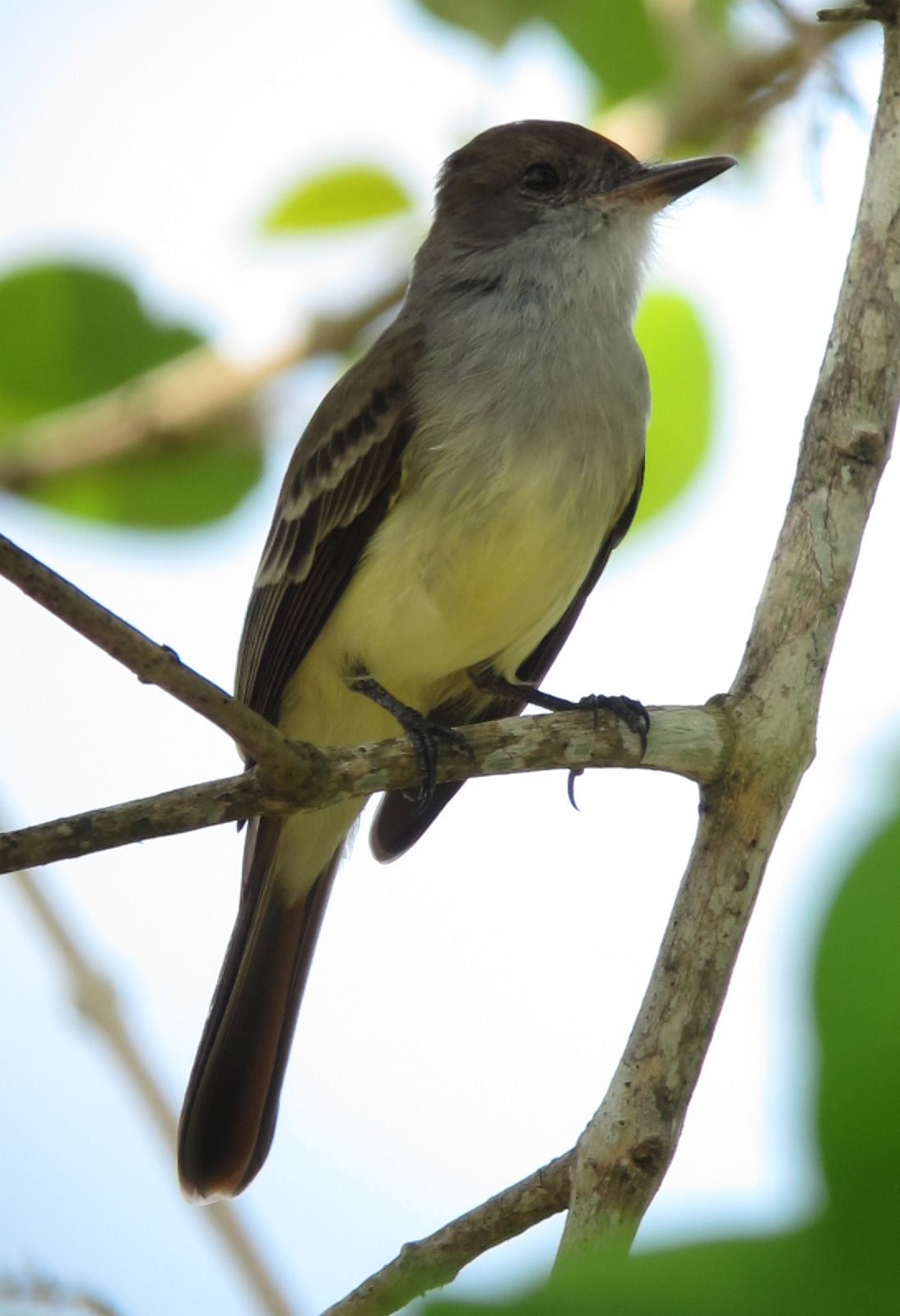

Conservation status
- Least Concern (IUCN 3.1)

Scientific classification
- Kingdom: Animalia
- Phylum: Chordata
- Class: Aves
- Order: Passeriformes
- Family: Tyrannidae
- Genus: Myiarchus
- Species: M. venezuelensis

Binomial name
- Myiarchus venezuelensis Lawrence, 1865

= Venezuelan flycatcher =

Species of bird

The Venezuelan flycatcher (Myiarchus venezuelensis) is a passerine bird in the family Tyrannidae, the tyrant flycatchers. It is found in Colombia, Venezuela, and on Tobago.

== Taxonomy and systematics ==
The Venezuelan flycatcher was originally described as a species with its current binomial Myiarchus venezuelensis. In 1918 it was reclassified as a subspecies Myiarchus ferox, then called the Guiana flycatcher and now the short-crested flycatcher. That treatment lasted into the 1970s when it was again recognized as a distinct species.

The Venezuelan flycatcher is monotypic.

== Description ==
The Venezuelan flycatcher is 18 to 19 cm (7.1 to 7.5 in) long and weighs 27 to 33 g (0.95 to 1.2 oz). The sexes have the same plumage. Adults have a dark olive-green to brownish olive crown and upperparts. The crown has a slight crest and is slightly darker in the center, giving a streaked effect. Their lores are gray that extends to a short supercilium. Their cheeks are gray and their ear coverts brownish olive. Their wings are mostly dusky with thin rufous outer edges on the primaries. The secondaries and tertials have rufous, pale yellowish, and white edges on respectively their outer, middle, and inner feather sets. Their wing coverts are dusky with pale rufous to whitish tips that form two wing bars. Their tail's upper surface is dusky and its lower surface lighter. The outermost pair of feathers have whitish or yellow edges and the rest have rufous edges. Their chin, throat, and upper breast are gray with a slight olivaceous tinge on the edge of the breast. Their belly and undertail coverts are pale yellow. There is some geographical variation in the intensity of the upper- and underparts' colors. They have a brown iris, a brownish black bill with often a pinkish to orange base to the mandible's underside, and gray to slaty-black legs and feet. It is almost identical to the short-crested flycatcher and Panama flycatcher (M. panamensis) and "almost certainly not separable in [the] field from either except by voice and range" (emphasis in original).

== Distribution and habitat ==
The Venezuelan flycatcher has a disjunct distribution. Separate populations are on the islands of Trinidad and Margarita and in Venezuela's northern Bolívar state. Sources differ on the extent of its largest range. They agree that it extends from northern Colombia's Sucre Department east into Venezuela. McMullan's field guide shows it extending south straddling the Colombia-Venezuela border to Norte de Santander Department. Hilty's field guide shows it on the border only in the far north and in northern Táchira on the Colombian border, and the BirdLife International (BLI) map shows it extending south to the east of the border and crossing it from Táchira into Norte de Santander. Hilty and BLI agree that its range continues from northeastern Colombia across northern Venezuela to Guárico. BLI then shows the range extending south to central Apure; Hilty does not show that.

The Venezuelan flycatcher inhabits a variety of landscapes; throughout in most it is especially associated with the understory of deciduous and semi-deciduous woodlands. It is found in clearings and the edges of both dry and moist forest, in gallery forest, in pastures with scattered trees and scrub, and in anthropogenic landscapes such as plantations, gardens, and parks. In its isolated eastern Venezuelan range it is found within deciduous woodland bordered by dry savanna and wet evergreen forest. In Colombia it also occurs in mangroves. In elevation it ranges from sea level to 700 m (2,300 ft) in Colombia and to about 500 m (1,600 ft) in Venezuela.

== Behavior ==
=== Movement ===
The Venezuelan flycatcher is a year-round resident.

=== Feeding ===
The Venezuelan flycatcher feeds on insects and small fruits. It usually forages singly or in pairs. It perches in the open in the forest's mid-story and primarily captures prey and collects fruit while briefly hovering after a short sally. To a lesser degree it captures it in mid-air and by grabbing it from vegetation without hovering.

=== Breeding ===
In Venezuela the Venezuelan flycatcher breeds between March and June. In Colombia it has a similar main breeding season but has also bred in October. The species' nest has not been described; the species is assumed to nest in tree cavities like others of its genus. The clutch size, incubation period, time to fledging, and details of parental care are not known.

=== Vocalization ===
The Venezuelan flycatcher's dawn song is "a repeated [series] of plaintive whistles (no huit notes)". Its day song is similar but not often heard. It also gives "repeated hiccup calls, rasps, rasp-whistles [and] a whistled wheer-r-r".

== Status ==
The IUCN has assessed the Venezuelan flycatcher as being of Least Concern. It has a large range; its population size is not known and is believed to be decreasing. No immediate threats have been identified. It is considered common in Colombia and "uncommon and local...but underreported" in Venezuela. It is found in many protected areas on the mainland and on Tobago. "It is common in disturbed habitats, like plantations, farms, gardens, and patches of urban forest; as such, it is probably not very sensitive to human disturbance."
