= Lluidas Vale, Jamaica =

Settlement in Saint Catherine Parish, Jamaica

Coordinates: 18.127°N 77.145°W

Location of Lluidas Vale in Jamaica

Lluidas Vale, also known as Worthy Park, is a settlement in Saint Catherine Parish, Jamaica. It has a population of 3,413 as of 2009.

== Etymology ==
The name of the settlement either refers to the Spanish term luzida, meaning 'happy' or 'fine', or lluvias, meaning 'rains'.

== Geography and geology ==
Lluidas Vale, whose elevations range from 1,500 feet (460 m) to 3,250 feet (990 m), is bordered by Ewarton and Swansea Coffee Mountain. A church is located at the heart of Lluidas Vale. The Lluidas Vales Cave is located 0.5 kilometres (0.31 mi) southwest of the parish and near the Lluidas Sinkhole. Lluidas Vales has an abundance of sugarcane fields and also has a wide range of limestone karst. In particular, the settlement is surrounded by kegelkarst.

== Flora and fauna ==
Most of the vegetation in Lluidas Vale has been cleared for agricultural purposes, although the wet limestone forest remains largely intact.

Trees commonly found in Lluidas Vale include:

- Terminalia latifolia
- Cedrela odorata
- Nectandra trees
- fig (Ficus) trees

Lluidas Vale is also home to a variety of birds including:

- Podiceps dominicus
- Podilymbus podiceps
- Butorides virescens
- Hydranassa tricolor
- Florida caerulea
- Ardeola ibis
- Egretta thula
- Nyctanassa violacea
- Cathartes aura
- Buteo jamaicensis
- Falco sparverius
- Porzana carolina
- Porphyrula martinica
- Gallinula chloropus
- Fulica americana
- Jacana spinosa
- Charadrius vociferus
- Columba leucocephala
- Zenaida aurita
- Zenaida asiatica
- Columbigallina passerina
- Leptotila jamaicensis
- Geotrygon montana
- Geotrygon versicolor
- Amazona collaria
- Amazona agilis
- Aratinga nana
- Forpus passerinus
- Hyetornis pluvialis
- Saurothera vetula
- Crotophaga ani
- Tyto furcata
- Pseudoscops grammicus
- Nyctibius griseus
- Chordeiles minor
- Streptoprocne zonaris
- Cypseloides niger
- Tachornis phoenicobia
- Anthracothorax mango
- Trochilus polytmus
- Mellisuga minima
- Todus todus
- Centurus radiolatus
- Sphyrapicus varius
- Platypsaris niger
- Tyrannus dominicensis
- Tyrannus caudifasciatus
- Myiarchus stolidus
- Myiarchus barbirostris
- Myiarchus validus
- Contopus caribaeus
- Hirundo rustica
- Petrochelidon fulva
- Corvus jamaicensis
- Mimus polyglottos
- Dumetella carolinensis
- Turdus jamaicensis
- Turdus aurantius
- Myadestes genibarbis
- Sturnus vulgaris
- Vireo modestus
- Vireo altiloquus
- Vireo osburni
- Mniotilta varia
- Helmitheros vermivorus
- Parula americana
- Dendroica magnolia
- Dendroica caerulescens
- Dendroica tigrina
- Dendroica virens
- Dendroica striata
- Dendroica pharetra
- Seiurus aurocapillus
- Setophaga ruticilla
- Coereba flaveola
- Euneornis campestris
- Pyrrhuphonia jamaica
- Spindalis zena
- Piranga olivacea
- Quiscalus niger
- Icterus leucopteryx
- Icterus galbula
- Sicalis flaveola
- Loxigilla violacea
- Tiaris olivacea
- Tiaris bicolor
- Loxipasser anoxanthus
- Ammodramus savannarum
