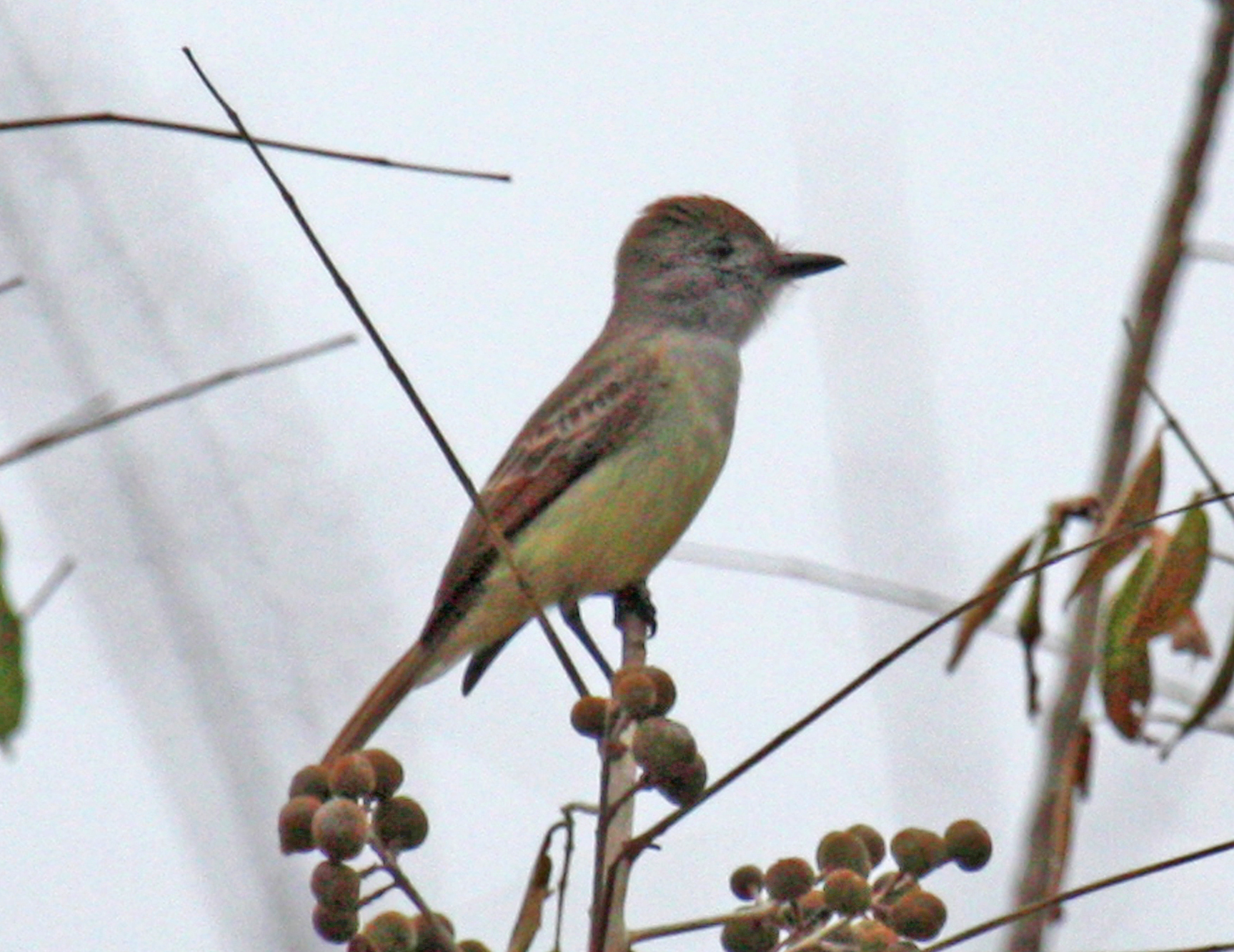

Conservation status
- Least Concern (IUCN 3.1)

Scientific classification
- Kingdom: Animalia
- Phylum: Chordata
- Class: Aves
- Order: Passeriformes
- Family: Tyrannidae
- Genus: Myiarchus
- Species: M. yucatanensis

Binomial name
- Myiarchus yucatanensis Lawrence, 1871

= Yucatan flycatcher =

Species of bird

The Yucatan flycatcher (Myiarchus yucatanensis) is a species of bird in the family Tyrannidae, the tyrant flycatchers. It is found in Belize, Guatemala and Mexico.

== Taxonomy and systematics ==
The Yucatan flycatcher was originally described with its current binomial Myiarchus yucatanensis. It has three subspecies, the nominate M. y. yucatanensis (Lawrence, 1871), M. y. lanyoni (Parkes & Phillips, AR, 1967), and M. y. navai (Parkes, 1982).

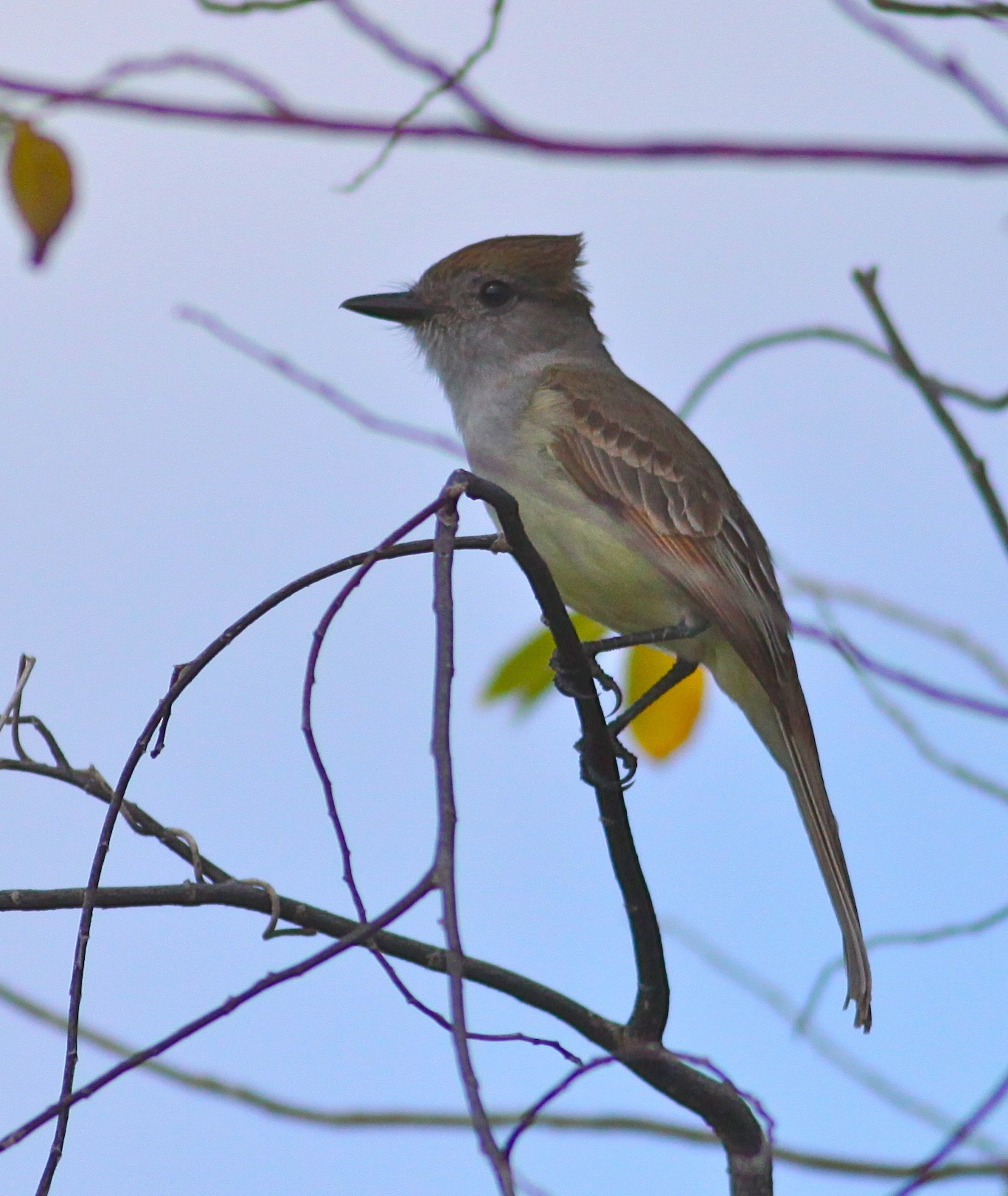

== Description ==
The Yucatan flycatcher is 17.5 to 19 cm (6.9 to 7.5 in) long and weighs 19 to 23 g (0.67 to 0.81 oz). The sexes have the same plumage. Adults of the nominate subspecies have a crown whose feathers have dark brown centers and wide rufescent edges; the feathers form a crest. They have grayish lores and half ring under the eye on an otherwise darker gray face. Their upperparts are olive-green with a rufous tinge on the uppertail coverts. Their wings are mostly brown with wide rufous outer edges on the primaries and pale grayish white outer edges on the other flight feathers. Their greater and median wing coverts have pale gray tips that form indistinct wing bars. Their tail is mostly brown with rufous inner webs on the central feathers and sometimes the others as well. Their throat and breast are gray and their belly and undertail coverts yellow with an olive-green wash on the flanks. Subspecies M. y. lanyoni has little or no rufous on the crown, almost blackish upperparts, and paler yellow underparts than the nominate. M. y. navai has upperparts intermediate between the nominate and lanyuoni and lighter yellow underparts than the nominate. All subspecies have a dark blackish iris, bill, and legs and feet.

It is a typical Myiarchus flycatcher and is similar in appearance to the dusky-capped flycatcher (M. tuberculifer), brown-crested flycatcher (M. tyrannulus) and the great crested flycatcher (M. crinitus). However, none of them have a rufescent crown.

== Distribution and habitat ==
The nominate subspecies of the Yucatan flycatcher is found far eastern Tabasco state and the northern and central Yucatán Peninsula. Subspecies M. y. lanyoni is found on Cozumel Island. M. y. navai is found in Mexico's southern Quintana Roo and southeastern Campeche states and from there south into northern Belize and into Guatemala in the area of Tikal in northern Petén Department. It possibly also occurs on Belize's Ambergris Caye. The species inhabits a variety of semi-open tropical landscapes including the edges and openings of humid and semi-arid deciduous forest, scrubby woodlands, and in rainforest, clearings and early second-growth. In elevation it ranges from sea level to about 250 or 300 m (800 or 1,000 ft).

== Behavior ==
=== Movement ===
The Yucatan flycatcher is believed to be a year-round resident.

=== Feeding ===
The Yucatan flycatcher's diet has not been studied but includes Hymenoptera. It forages in the forest's mid-story. Nothing else is known about its diet or feeding behavior.

=== Breeding ===
The Yucatan flycatcher's breeding season has not been studied but includes March. Nothing else is known about its breeding biology.

=== Vocalization ===
The Yucatan flycatcher's dawn song is "a pleasant whistled wuueeee! or a more drawn-out wuuueeeep!". Its calls include "a more agitated wee'wee'wee'wee'wee'weeeur and a prrrrrt".

== Status ==
The IUCN has assessed the Yucatan flycatcher as being of Least Concern. It has a large range; its estimated population of at least 20,000 mature individuals is believed to be decreasing. No immediate threats have been identified. It is considered fairly common to common overall and fairly common in Belize and Guatemala. However the "[p]opulation on Cozumel I (race lanyoni) has proven surprisingly difficult to locate at times, and concern over its conservation status seems warranted." The other subspecies occur in some protected areas.
