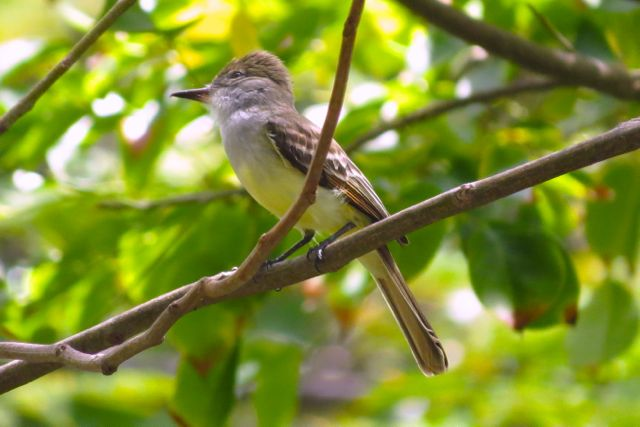

Conservation status
- Least Concern (IUCN 3.1)

Scientific classification
- Kingdom: Animalia
- Phylum: Chordata
- Class: Aves
- Order: Passeriformes
- Family: Tyrannidae
- Genus: Myiarchus
- Species: M. nugator

Binomial name
- Myiarchus nugator Riley, 1904

= Grenada flycatcher =

Species of bird

The Grenada flycatcher (Myiarchus nugator) is a species of bird in the family Tyrannidae, the tyrant flycatchers. It is found in Grenada and Saint Vincent and the Grenadines.

== Taxonomy and systematics ==
The Grenada flycatcher was formally described as Myiarchus oberi nugator, a subspecies of the Lesser Antillean flycatcher. It was for a time considered to be a subspecies of the brown-crested flycatcher (M. tyrannulus) and there is some evidence that it should again be treated that way.

The Grenada flycatcher is monotypic.

== Description ==
The Grenada flycatcher is a large flycatcher, about 20 cm (7.9 in) long and weighing about 32 to 45 g (1.1 to 1.6 oz). The sexes have the same plumage. Adults have a brownish head and upperparts; their crown feathers form a small crest. Their wings are mostly brownish with cinnamon to rufous edges on the outer webs of the primaries and pale whitish edges on the outer webs of the secondaries and tertials. The wing's coverts have fuscous tips that show as two faint wing bars. Their tail's upperside is brownish with rufous-brown inner webs on all but the innermost pair of feathers; its underside is rufous-brown. Their throat and breast are gray that is paler on the throat. Their belly and undertail coverts are pale lemon-yellow. They have a dark brown iris, a dark bill with a pinkish base to the mandible, and dark legs and feet.

== Distribution and habitat ==
The Grenada flycatcher is found on Grenada, St. Vincent, and on most of the smaller Grenadines between them. It inhabits all of the vegetated habitats on the islands including several types of forest and scrublands. It also occurs in open areas around human settlements. It shuns rocky areas with little greenery. In elevation it ranges from sea level to the tops of the islands at about 1,200 m (3,900 ft).

== Behavior ==
=== Movement ===
The Grenada flycatcher is a year-round resident.

=== Feeding ===
The Grenada flycatcher feeds primarily on arthropods and berries and to a lesser degree includes small lizards in its diet. It usually forages singly. It captures most insect prey in mid-air with sallies from a perch; it often returns to the same perch. It also gleans arthropods and berries while perched.

=== Breeding ===
The Grenada flycatcher apparently breeds between March and October. It nests in cavities, usually those in trees and the open ends of pipes; there is one record of a nest in an old cannon. The nest is made from sticks and other plant material, mammal hair, and anthropogenic material such as fabric. The clutch is two to four eggs. The incubation period, time to fledging, and details of parental care are not known.

=== Vocalization ===
The Grenada flycatcher's principal vocalizations are a "loud quip or harsh queuk".

== Status ==
The IUCN has assessed the Grenada flycatcher as being of Least Concern. It has a limited range; its population size is not known and is believed to be stable. No immediate threats have been identified. It is considered generally common, and apparently more common on Grenada than Saint Vincent. It occurs in a few small, protected areas. It is potentially threatened by unregulated deforestation, invasive species, and climate changes that might affect its habitat and food sources.
