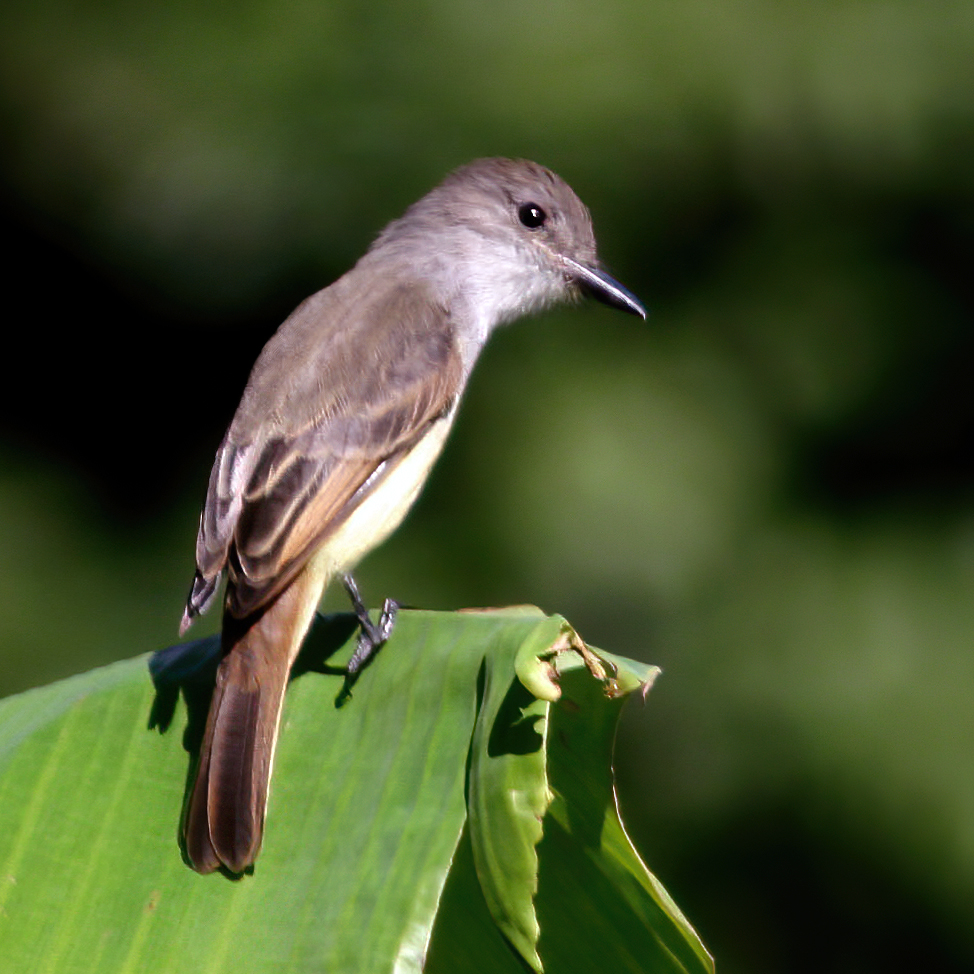

Conservation status
- Least Concern (IUCN 3.1)

Scientific classification
- Kingdom: Animalia
- Phylum: Chordata
- Class: Aves
- Order: Passeriformes
- Family: Tyrannidae
- Genus: Myiarchus
- Species: M. oberi

Binomial name
- Myiarchus oberi Lawrence, 1877

= Lesser Antillean flycatcher =

Species of bird

The Lesser Antillean flycatcher (Myiarchus oberi) is a species of bird in the family Tyrannidae, the tyrant flycatchers. It is found in Barbuda, Dominica, Guadeloupe, Martinique, Nevis, Saint Kitts, and Saint Lucia.

== Taxonomy and systematics ==
The Lesser Antillean flycatcher has these four subspecies:

- M. o. berlepschii Cory, 1888
- M. o. oberi Lawrence, 1877
- M. o. sclateri Lawrence, 1879
- M. o. sanctaeluciae Hellmayr & Seilern, 1915

At various times some authors have assigned M. o. sclateri as a subspecies of the stolid flycatcher (M. stolidus) and M. o. sanctaeluciae as a subspecies of the brown-crested flycatcher (M. tyrannulus).

== Description ==
The Lesser Antillean flycatcher is 19 to 22 cm (7.5 to 8.7 in) long and weighs 21 to 37 g (0.74 to 1.3 oz). The sexes have the same plumage. Adults of the nominate subspecies M. o. oberi have a dark olive-green crown that forms a crest. Their face is a grayer olive-green. Their upperparts are mostly dark olive-green with rufous edges on the uppertail coverts. Their wings are mostly brown with rufous outer edges on the primaries and inner edges of the tertials. The outer edges of the tertials and secondaries are paler rufous. The wing's greater and median coverts have grayish white or rufous tips that form two faint wing bars. Their tail is mostly dark olive-green with a wide rufous stripe on the inner vanes of the feathers. Their throat and breast are gray that is paler on the throat. Their belly and undertail coverts are yellow with a greenish wash on the flanks.

Subspecies M. o. sclateri is the smallest of the four and has no rufous on its tail. M. o. sanctaeluciae is the largest subspecies but otherwise is like the nominate. M. o. berlepschii is intermediate in size between sanctaeluciae and the nominate; its belly is often a paler yellow than the nominate's. All subspecies have a dark iris, a dark bill, and dark legs and feet.

== Distribution and habitat ==
The nominate subspecies of the Lesser Antillean flycatcher is found on Guadeloupe and Dominica. Subspecies M. o. sanctaeluciae is found on St. Lucia. M. o. berlepschii is found on St. Kitts, Nevis, and Barbuda. M. o. sclateri is found on Martinique. The species primarily inhabits the canopy and edges of tropical evergreen forest, tree plantations, and thorn scrub. It occurs much less frequently in secondary forest. In elevation it ranges mostly between 100 and 900 m (300 and 3,000 ft) and is almost never found lower.

== Behavior ==
=== Movement ===
The Lesser Antillean flycatcher is a year-round resident.

=== Feeding ===
The Lesser Antillean flycatcher feeds on insects and small fruits. It perches upright in somewhat dense vegetation while searching for prey. It mostly takes prey and fruit by gleaning while briefly hovering after a short sally from the perch. It also grabs them without hovering after a sally and takes insects in mid-air.

=== Breeding ===
The Lesser Antillean flycatcher breeds between March and July. It builds a loose nest of plant fibers, plant down, and feathers in a tree cavity. The clutch is three to four eggs that are creamy buff with purplish brown and violet-gray markings. The incubation period, time to fledging, and details of parental care are not known.

=== Vocalization ===
The Lesser Antillean flycatcher's dawn song "has a relatively long first note followed by two very short notes and a plaintive, lower final note". It also makes "[l]oud, prolonged plaintive whistles and also short whistles".

== Status ==
The IUCN has assessed the Lesser Antillean flycatcher as being of Least Concern. It has a small range; its population size is not known and is believed to be decreasing. No immediate threats have been identified. It is considered rare on Guadeloupe and common on the other islands. The species is "[s]usceptible to habitat loss through both natural (hurricane damage) and anthropogenic (vegetation clearance) causes".
