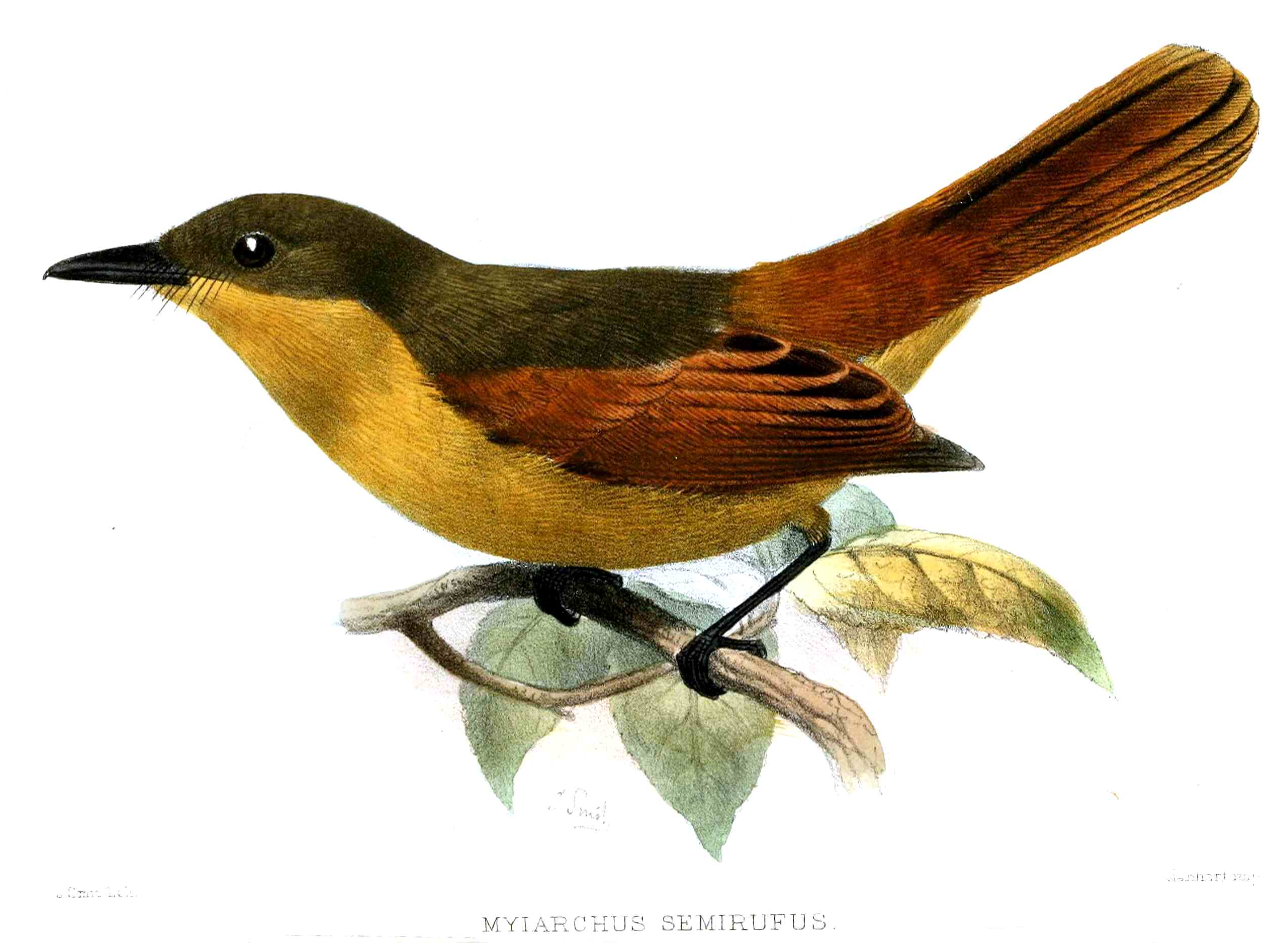

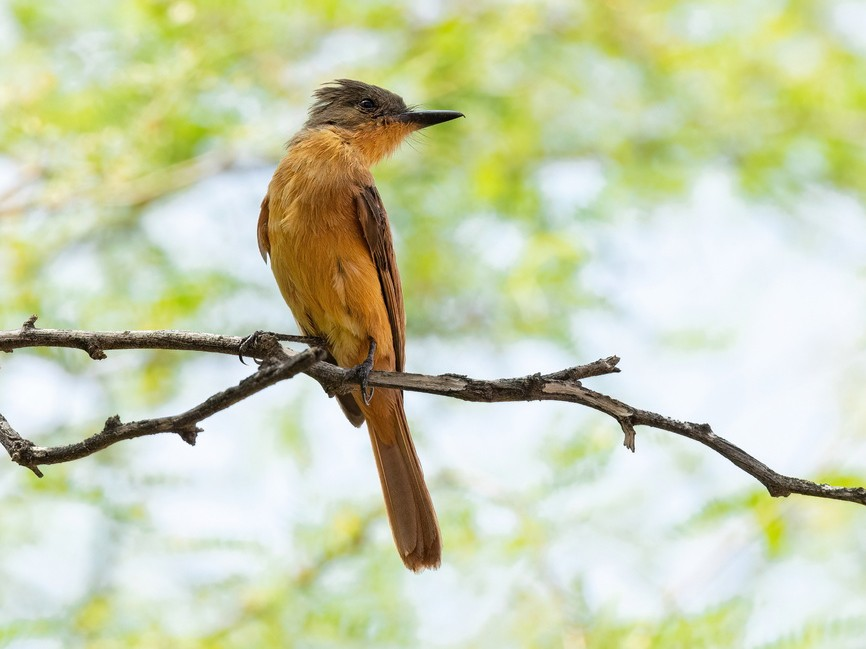

Conservation status
- Vulnerable (IUCN 3.1)

Scientific classification
- Kingdom: Animalia
- Phylum: Chordata
- Class: Aves
- Order: Passeriformes
- Family: Tyrannidae
- Genus: Myiarchus
- Species: M. semirufus

Binomial name
- Myiarchus semirufus Sclater & Salvin, 1878

= Rufous flycatcher =

Species of bird

The rufous flycatcher (Myiarchus semirufus) is a Vulnerable species of bird in the family Tyrannidae, the tyrant flycatchers. It is considered endemic to Peru but has possibly occurred in Ecuador.

== Taxonomy and systematics ==
The rufous flycatcher was originally described with its current binomial Myiarchus semirufus. Because it is basal to genus Myiarchus and in some ways is more similar to the pale-bellied mourner (Rhytipterna immunda) than to other Myiarchus its current placement is not necessarily final. It has at times been placed in its own genus Muscifur.

The rufous flycatcher is monotypic.

== Description ==
The rufous flycatcher is 17 to 19 cm (6.7 to 7.5 in) long and weighs 21 to 25 g (0.74 to 0.88 oz). The sexes have the same plumage. Adults have a brown head and upperparts except for rufous uppertail coverts. Their wings are mostly rufous with brown primary coverts and some brown on the others. Their outer pair of tail feathers are rufous-brown and the rest have dark rufous inner webs and dark chocolate-brown outer webs with a thin rufous edge. Their throat and underparts are light cinnamon-rufous that is lighter on the chin and darker on the undertail coverts. Their iris, bill, and legs and feet are dark. Juveniles are similar to adults.

== Distribution and habitat ==
The rufous flycatcher is found in northwestern Peru from Tumbes Department to Ancash Department. It previously was found further south to northern Lima Department. For most of the length of its range it is found within 50 km (30 mi) of the coast. In addition, unconfirmed sight records in extreme southwestern Ecuador lead the South American Classification Committee of the American Ornithological Society to class it as hypothetical in that country. It inhabits an arid landscape of thorn scrub, steppe, and areas of sparse grass with widely separated mesquite (Prosopis) and Acacia trees. It also occurs in agricultural areas. In elevation it ranges from sea level to 500 m (1,600 ft).

== Behavior ==
=== Movement ===
The rufous flycatcher is believed to be a year-round resident.

=== Feeding ===
Nothing is known about the rufous flycatcher's diet or foraging behavior.

=== Breeding ===
The rufous flycatcher's breeding season has not been described though it appears that northern birds breed earlier than southern ones. A nest with eggs was found in December. Two nests have been described. One was an open cup lined with fur and fragments of paper and plastic. It was in a recess in a clump of Acacia macracantha. The other was similar but also had snake skin in its lining and was in a tree cavity. The maximum clutch is four eggs. The incubation period, time to fledging, and details of parental care are not known.

=== Vocalization ===
As of July 2025 xeno-canto had only four recordings of rufous flycatcher vocalizations; the Cornell Lab's Macaulay Library had 14 with no overlap. The species' dawn song is "alternated huit notes and rasping whistles with a more complex phrase derived from a hiccup note...and [a] simple descending whistle frequently interjected". Its calls are "a sharp, high pew! or teep!, and a quieter peeker-peeker, as well as quiet, low trills and short, shrill whistles".

== Status ==
The IUCN originally in 1988 assessed the rufous flycatcher as being of Least Concern but in 2008 reassessed it as Endangered; since 2018 it has been classed as Vulnerable. It has a limited range and its estimated population of 2500 to 10,000 mature individuals is believed to be decreasing. Clearance of the vegetation in the species' range for firewood and agriculture is the main threat. Direct persecution and non-native species are also threats. It is considered uncommon in the northern part of its range and less common in the south where its habitat has mostly been degraded or destroyed. It occurs in two protected areas.
