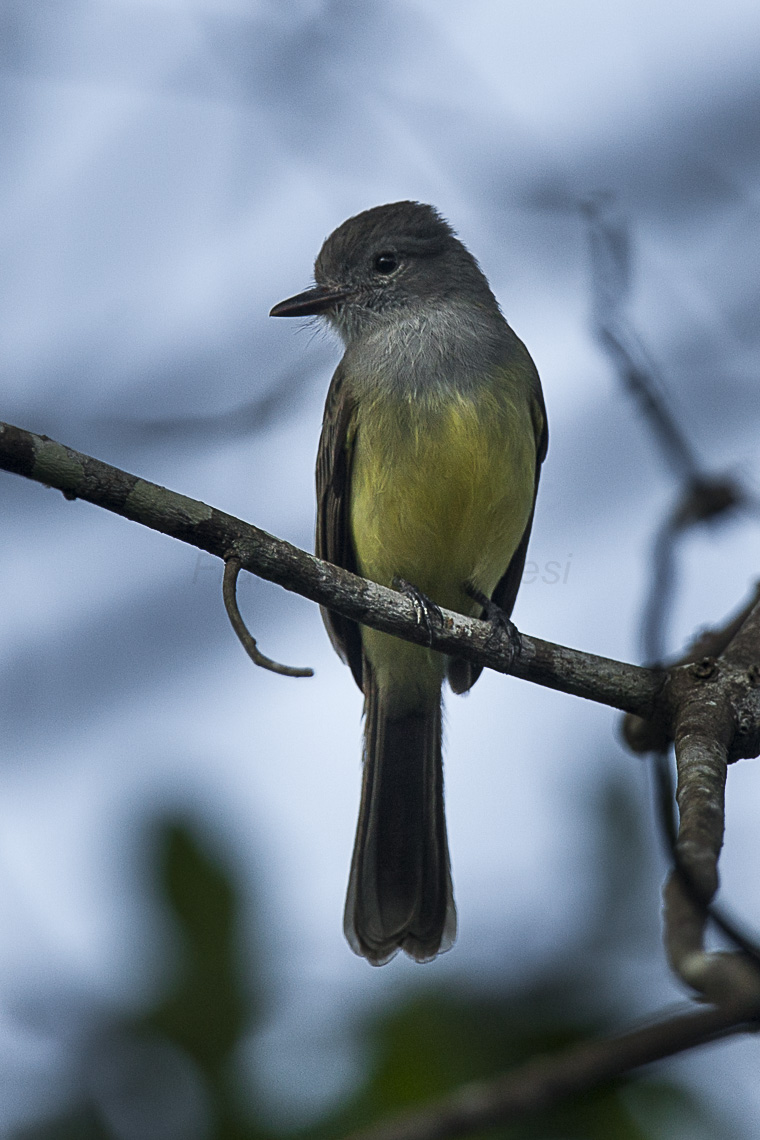
- In Panama

Conservation status
- Least Concern (IUCN 3.1)

Scientific classification
- Kingdom: Animalia
- Phylum: Chordata
- Class: Aves
- Order: Passeriformes
- Family: Tyrannidae
- Genus: Myiarchus
- Species: M. panamensis

Binomial name
- Myiarchus panamensis Lawrence, 1860

= Panama flycatcher =

Species of bird

The Panama flycatcher (Myiarchus panamensis) is a species of bird in the family Tyrannidae, the tyrant flycatchers. It is found in Colombia, Costa Rica, Ecuador, Panama, and Venezuela.

== Taxonomy and systematics ==
The Venezuelan flycatcher was originally described as a species with its current binomial Myiarchus panamensis. In 1918 it was reclassified as a subspecies Myiarchus ferox, then called the Guiana flycatcher and now the short-crested flycatcher. That treatment lasted until late in the century when it was again recognized as a distinct species. A molecular genetic study published in 2020 found that the Panama flycatcher is sister to the short-crested flycatcher.

The Panama flycatcher has two subspecies, the nominate M. p. panamensis (Lawrence, 1860) and M. p. actiosus (Ridgway, 1906).

== Description ==
The Panama flycatcher is 19 to 20 cm (7.5 to 7.9 in) long and weighs about 28 to 38.5 g (0.99 to 1.4 oz). The sexes have the same plumage. Adults of the nominate subspecies have a grayish olive crown and upperparts. The crown has a slight crest and is slightly darker in the center, giving a streaked effect. Their face is otherwise gray. Their wings are mostly grayish olive with pale whitish yellow outer webs on the tertials. Their tail is brown with slightly paler outer vanes on the outermost pair of feathers. Their throat and breast are gray and their belly and undertail coverts are yellow with a greenish wash on the upper flanks. Subspecies M. p. actiosus has grayer upperparts and a paler belly than the nominate. Both subspecies have a dark iris, a dark bill with often a paler base to the mandible, and dark legs and feet. Juveniles of both subspecies have rufous edges on the wing coverts and tail feathers.

== Distribution and habitat ==
Subspecies M. p. actiosus of the Panama flycatcher is the more northerly of the two and has a far smaller range. It is found on the Pacific coast of Costa Rica from the Gulf of Nicoya south almost to the Osa Peninsula. The nominate subspecies is found from extreme southwestern Costa Rica through Panama on the Pacific slope and from Bocas del Toro Province on the Caribbean slope. It also occurs on most of the islands off the Pacific coast of Panama. Its range continues into Colombia where in the west it extends the length of the country south on the Pacific slope and slightly into northwestern Ecuador. Its range crosses northern Colombia into the Maricaibo Basin in northwestern Venezuela and extends south in Colombia into the lower valley of the Cauca River and to the upper Magdalena River valley.

The Panama flycatcher's subspecies M. p. actiosus inhabits only coastal mangroves. The nominate subspecies inhabits a variety of landscapes including tropical deciduous forest, gallery forest and secondary forest. It also occurs in mangroves (especially on the Pacific slope) and somewhat open habitats such as woodlands and pastures with scattered shrubs. In elevation it ranges overall from sea level to 1,400 m (4,600 ft) but reaches only 800 m (2,600 ft) in Colombia and 150 m (500 ft) in Venezuela.

== Behavior ==
=== Movement ===
The Panama flycatcher is generally considered to be a year-round resident. However, some elevational movement is suspected in Colombia.

=== Feeding ===
The Panama flycatcher feeds on insects and small fruit. In most habitats it sallies from a perch to take prey in mid-air or snatches prey and fruit from vegetation. In open areas it runs along the ground and in mangroves among the roots and sallies up to take prey.

=== Breeding ===
The Panama flycatcher breeds from March to June and possibly into July in some areas. Its nest is a bulky mass of rootlets, plant down, plant fibers, animal hair, and snake skin. It is usually in a tree cavity between about 4 and 12 m (15 and 40 ft) above ground but sometimes under a structure's eave or a nest box. The usual clutch is two or three eggs. The incubation period, time to fledging, and details of parental care are not known.

=== Vocalization ===
The Panama flycatcher's dawn song is "isolated, short, slowly modulated whistles given every 2–3 seconds"; during the day it makes the same song with longer intervals between the whistles. Its calls are "[r]epeated hiccups (normally disyllabic), rasping whistles and rolls in response to intruding conspecifics". In Costa Rica it "[w]histles a clear wheer...sometimes followed by a long, fast, rolling trill.

== Status ==
The IUCN has assessed the Panama flycatcher as being of Least Concern. It has a large range; its estimated population of at least 500,000 mature individuals is believed to be stable. No immediate threats have been identified. It is considered fairly common in Costa Rica and common in Colombia. It occurs in a few protected areas in Costa Rica and Colombia.
