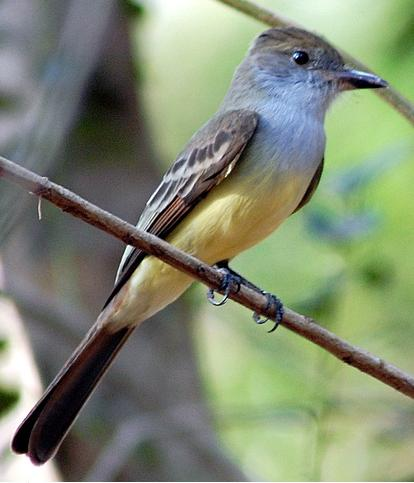
- Brown-crested flycatcher Myiarchus tyrannulus

Scientific classification
- Kingdom: Animalia
- Phylum: Chordata
- Class: Aves
- Order: Passeriformes
- Family: Tyrannidae
- Genus: Myiarchus; Cabanis, 1844

Type species
- Muscicapa ferox Gmelin, JF, 1789

= Myiarchus =

Genus of birds

Myiarchus is a genus of birds in the tyrant flycatcher family Tyrannidae. Most species are fairly similar in appearance and are easier to separate by voice than by plumage.

Myiarchus flycatchers are fairly large tyrant-flycatchers at 16–23 cm (6.3–9 in) long. They are all partially crested with a brown to gray back and head, a rufous to blackish tail and yellow to pale underparts (only exception is the rufous flycatcher with rufous underparts). They typically forage by perching on an open branch and looking outward and downward for prey, which primarily consists of insects. Once it spots a potential meal, the flycatcher rapidly and directly flies at the insect, which is normally on the exposed upper surface of a leaf or twig. It hovers briefly before the insect before grabbing it in its beak and flying away to typically a new perch.

== Taxonomy ==
The genus Myiarchus was introduced in 1844 by the German ornithologist Jean Cabanis. The name combines the Ancient Greek muia meaning "fly" with arkhos meaning "ruler" or "chief". Cabanis did not specify a type species for the genus but this was designated as the short-crested flycatcher by George Gray in 1855.

The genus contains 22 species:

Image	Scientific name	Common Name	Distribution
	Myiarchus semirufus	Rufous flycatcher	northwestern Peru
	Myiarchus yucatanensis	Yucatan flycatcher	Yucatan peninsula
	Myiarchus barbirostris	Sad flycatcher	Jamaica
	Myiarchus tuberculifer	Dusky-capped flycatcher	Neotropics
	Myiarchus swainsoni	Swainson's flycatcher	South America
	Myiarchus venezuelensis	Venezuelan flycatcher	northern Venezuela and Colombia
	Myiarchus panamensis	Panama flycatcher	Panama and Colombia
	Myiarchus ferox	Short-crested flycatcher	South America
	Myiarchus apical	Apical flycatcher	Colombia
	Myiarchus cephalotes	Pale-edged flycatcher	northern Andes
	Myiarchus phaecocephalus	Sooty-crowned flycatcher	western Ecuador and northern Peru
	Myiarchus cinerascens	Ash-throated flycatcher	southwestern US and Mexico
	Myiarchus nuttingi	Nutting's flycatcher	Mesoamerica
	Myiarchus crinnitus	Great crested flycatcher	eastern North America ; winters to Central America
	Myiarchus tyranulus	Brown-crested flycatcher	Neotropics
	Myiarchus magnirostris	Galapagos flycatcher	Galápagos Islands
	Myiarchus nugator	Grenada flycatcher	Grenada and St Vincent
	Myiarchus validus	Rufous-tailed flycatcher	Jamaica
	Myiarchus sagrae	La Sagra's flycatcher	northern Antilles
	Myiarchus stolidus	Stolid flycatcher	Jamaica and Hispaniola
	Myiarchus antillarum	Puerto Rican flycatcher	Puerto Rico
	Myiarchus oberi	Lesser Antillean flycatcher	Lesser Antilles
