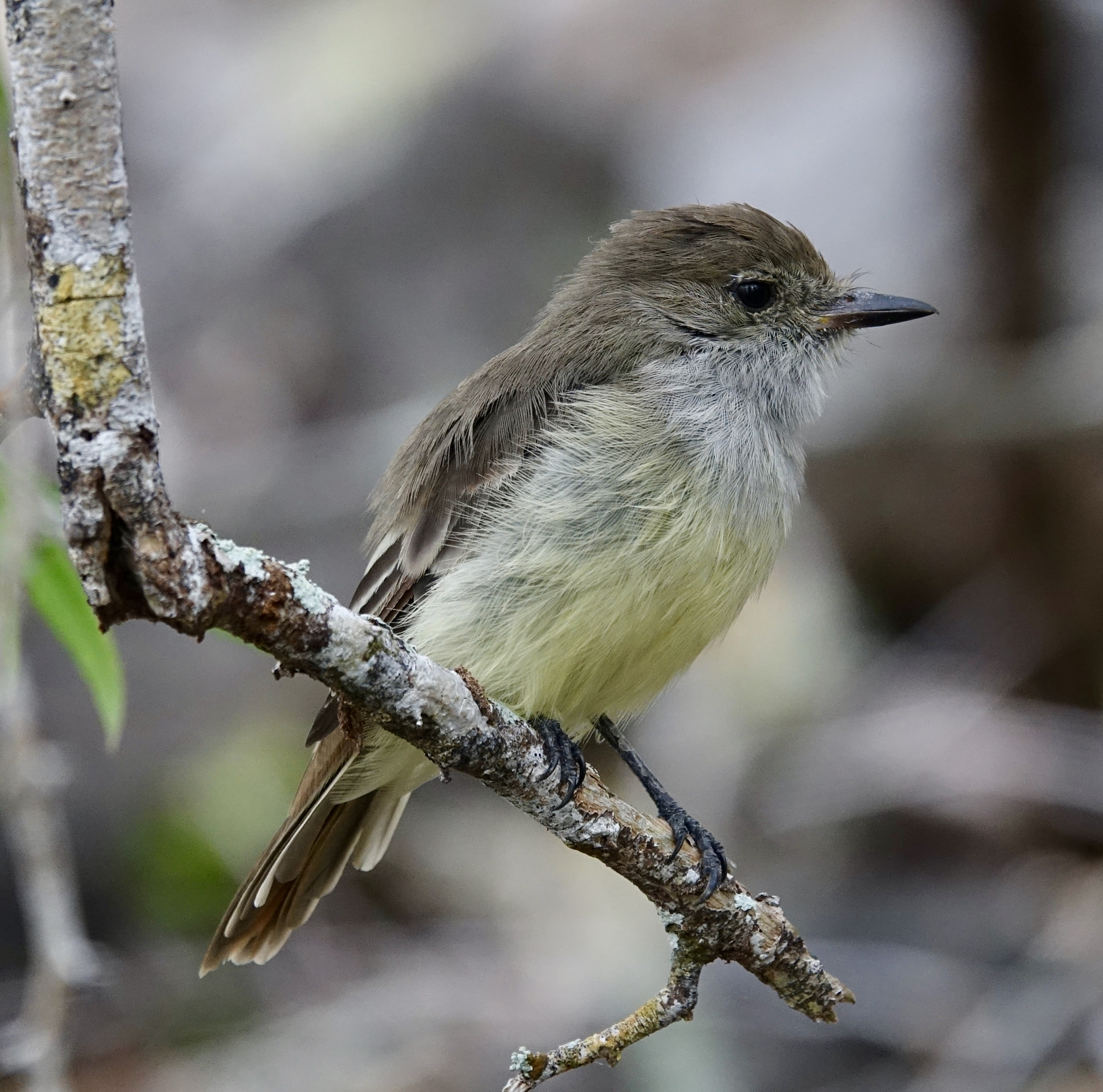

Conservation status
- Least Concern (IUCN 3.1)

Scientific classification
- Kingdom: Animalia
- Phylum: Chordata
- Class: Aves
- Order: Passeriformes
- Family: Tyrannidae
- Genus: Myiarchus
- Species: M. magnirostris

Binomial name
- Myiarchus magnirostris (Gould, 1838)
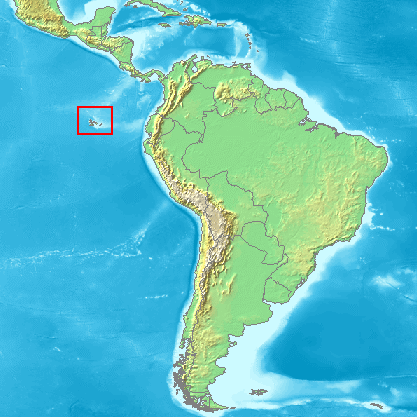

= Galapagos flycatcher =

Galápagos flycatcher

Species of bird

The Galapagos flycatcher (Myiarchus magnirostris), also known as the large-billed flycatcher, is a species of bird in the family Tyrannidae, the tyrant flycatcher. It is endemic to the Galápagos Islands.

== Taxonomy and systematics ==
The Galapagos flycatcher was formally described by John Gould as Myiobius magnirostris after initially naming it Tyrannula magnirostris. For a period in the early 1900s some authors placed it in the monotypic genus Eribates but by the 1970s that genus was merged into Myiarchus. The Galapagos flycatcher is monotypic.

The species' local name is "Papamoscas".

== Description ==
The Galapagos flycatcher is about 14 to 16 cm (5.5 to 6.3 in) long and weighs 12 to 18.5 g (0.42 to 0.65 oz). The sexes have the same plumage. Adults have a gray-brown to olive-brown crown whose feathers form a small crest. Their face is otherwise a lighter gray-brown. Their upperparts are mostly gray-brown to olive-brown with a brown rump. Their wings are mostly olive-brown to brown with paler edges on the primaries and secondaries and the wing's coverts have paler tips that show as two wing bars. Their tail is gray-brown with rufescent edges on the feathers. Their throat and upper breast are gray. Their lower breast and belly are sulphur-yellow. They have a dark iris, a thick dark brown to black bill with a pinkish base to the mandible, and gray legs and feet.

== Distribution and habitat ==
The Galapagos flycatcher is found on all of the Galápagos Islands except Darwin, Wolf, and Genovesa. There are, however, single late nineteenth or early twentieth century records from each of them. It inhabits all of the vegetated habitats on the islands. It occurs from sea level to at least 1,000 m (3,300 ft) but is more numerous in the moister lowlands.

== Behavior ==
=== General ===
The Galapagos flycatcher is "extremely tame and inquisitive". They sometimes enter buildings to catch insects. They often perch within 2 m (7 ft) of humans while peering about for prey.

=== Movement ===
The Galapagos flycatcher is a year-round resident.

=== Feeding ===
The Galapagos flycatcher's diet has not been fully defined but is known to include insects, other arthropods, and fruit. It typically forages in pairs within about 3 m (10 ft) of the ground because much of the islands' vegetation is of somewhat low stature. It gleans most prey and fruit while briefly hovering.

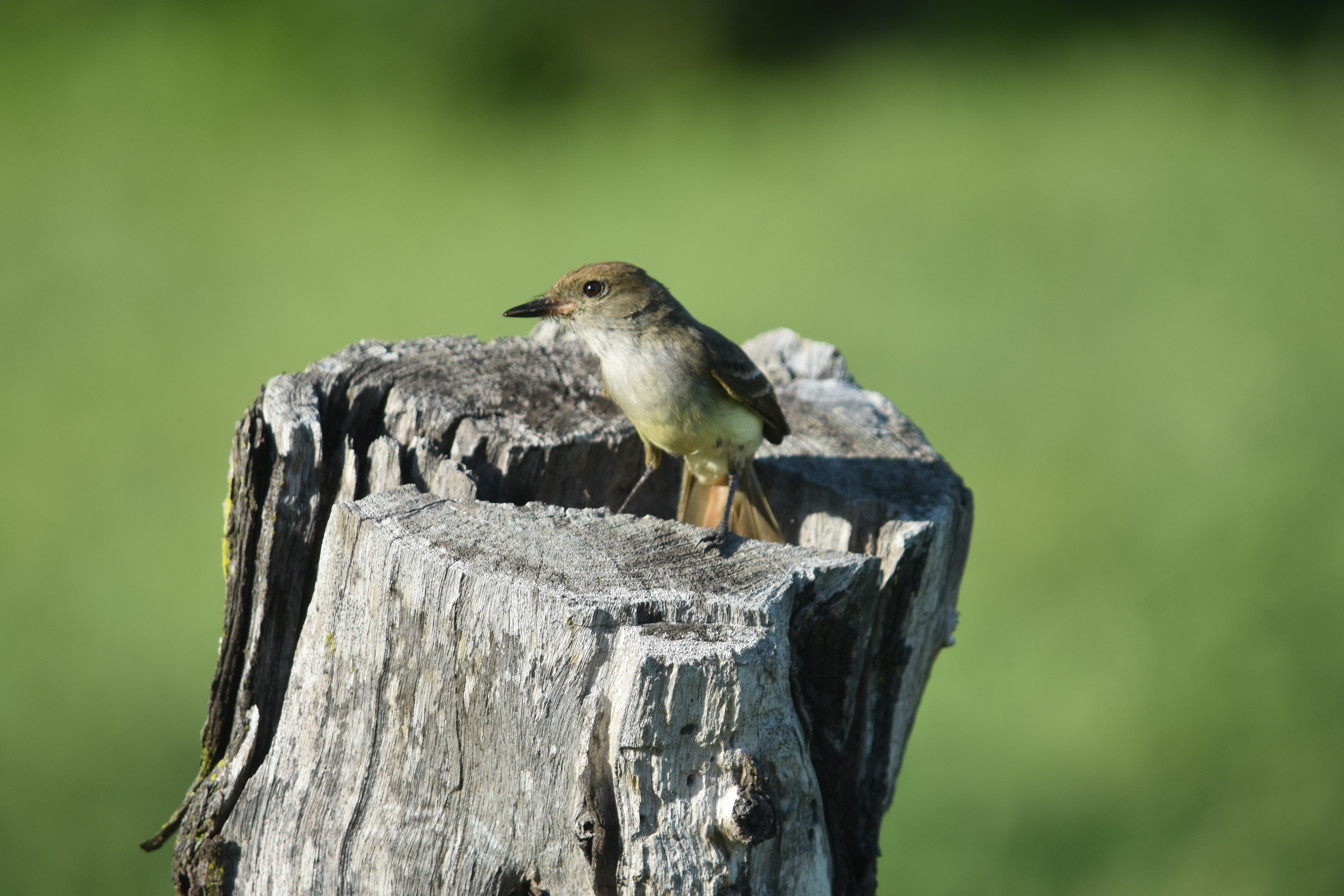
Adult Galapagos flycatcher leaving its cavity nest inside a wooden fencepost, on Floreana Island

=== Breeding ===
Although the Galapagos flycatcher apparently breeds throughout the year, most breeding is during the warmer wet season of December to May. It nests in cavities including natural holes in trees and cacti and also holes in concrete powerline poles. Nests are made mostly of plant material and can be lined with hair and feathers. Individuals sometimes perch on a person's shoulder and try to pull hair. The clutch is three to five eggs. The incubation period, time to fledging, and details of parental care are not known.

=== Vocalization ===
The Galapagos flycatcher's call is a "liquid wheet-wheet-wheet" and it has "a melodious song".

== Status ==
The IUCN has assessed the Galapagos flycatcher as being of Least Concern. It has a limited range; its population size is not known and is believed to be decreasing. No immediate threats have been identified. It is considered common throughout the islands. Most of the islands' favored lower to middle elevations are within Galapagos National Park so "it seems likely that human effects on the species would most likely come through depredation or nest predation by introduced rats and cats, or through losses to parasitism or diseases".

== Gallery ==
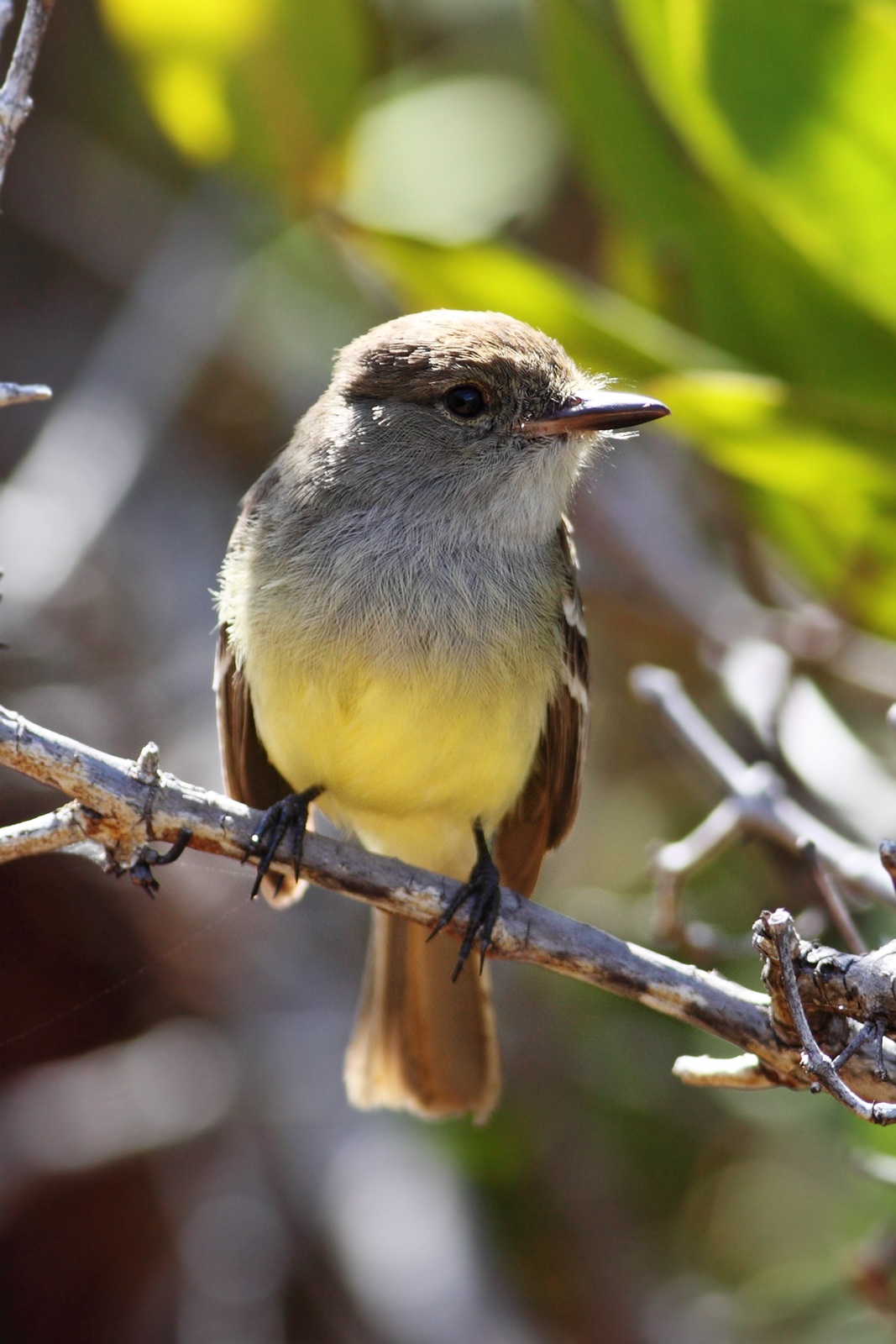
Ventral view

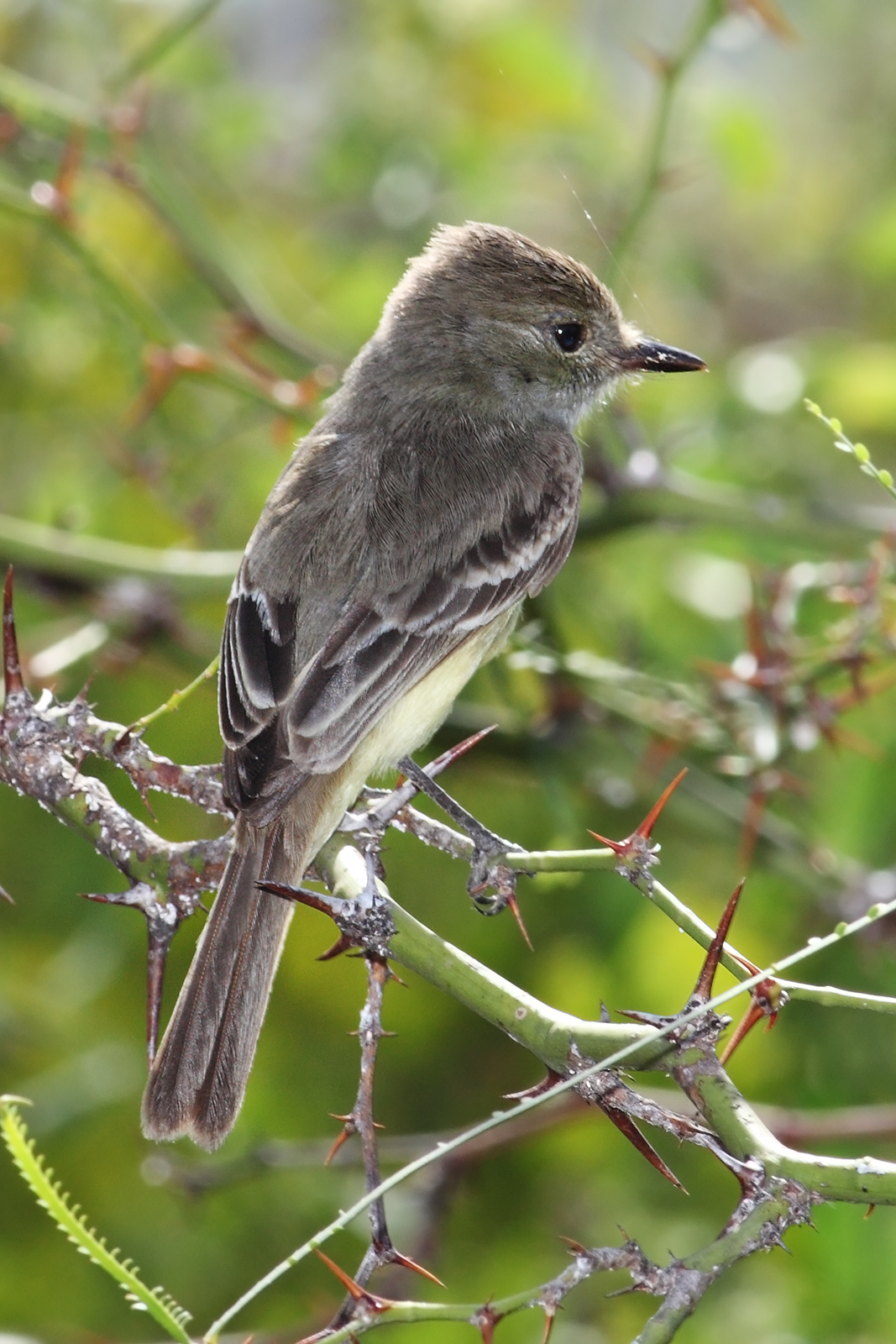
Dorsal view
