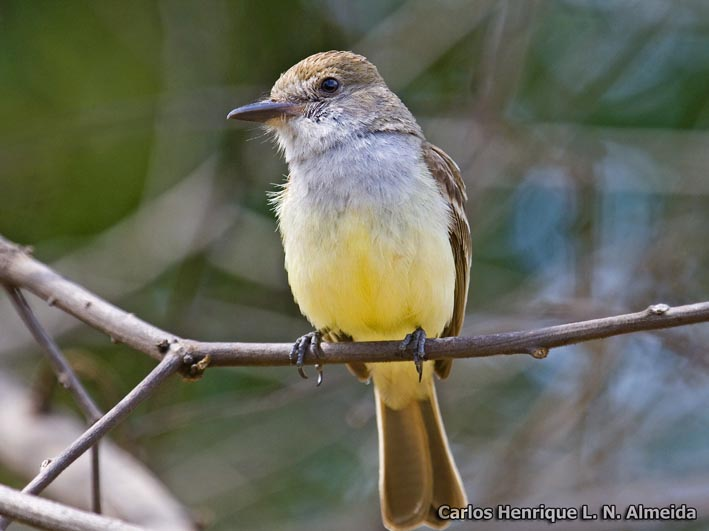

Conservation status
- Least Concern (IUCN 3.1)

Scientific classification
- Kingdom: Animalia
- Phylum: Chordata
- Class: Aves
- Order: Passeriformes
- Family: Tyrannidae
- Genus: Myiarchus
- Species: M. swainsoni

Binomial name
- Myiarchus swainsoni Cabanis & Heine, 1860
- Breeding Year-round Non-Breeding The map's borders between the year-round range and the breeding only and non-breeding ranges are not accurate; see the Distribution and Movement sections for details.

= Swainson's flycatcher =

Species of bird

Swainson's flycatcher (Myiarchus swainsoni) is a species of bird in the family Tyrannidae, the tyrant flycatchers. It is found in every mainland South American country except Chile and French Guiana and as a vagrant to Aruba and Trinidad.

== Taxonomy and systematics ==
As of July 2025, major taxonomic systems had assigned Swainson's flycatcher these four subspecies:

- M. s. phaeonotus Salvin & Godman, 1883
- M. s. pelzelni Berlepsch, 1883
- M. s. ferocior Cabanis, 1883
- M. s. swainsoni Cabanis & Heine, 1860

However, this taxonomy is unsettled. All four subspecies were previously treated as individual species but were combined as one in the 1930s. Studies published in the early 2000s showed that the nominate subspecies M. s. swainsoni differs genetically from the other three, which appear to be more closely related to the dusky-capped flycatcher (M. tuberculifer) than to swainsoni. In light of these studies some authors have urged that further studies be undertaken, and the South American Classification Committee of the American Ornithological Society is seeking a proposal to reevaluate the species. The Clements taxonomy takes a different approach than that suggested by the studies. It treats M. s. phaeonotus as "Swainson's flycatcher (phaeonotus) and groups the other three as the "Swainson's flycatcher (swainsoni group).

== Description ==
Swainson's flycatcher is 19.5 to 21 cm (7.7 to 8.3 in) long and weighs about 21 to 38 g (0.74 to 1.3 oz). The sexes have the same plumage. Adults of the nominate subspecies have a dull olive gray-green crown and upperparts with slightly browner uppertail coverts. The crown feathers form a slight crest. Their wings are mostly brown with rufous outer edges on the primaries. The secondaries and tertials have pale whitish yellow outermost webs and the tertials dirty white to rufous innermost webs. Their greater and median wing coverts have wide fuscous gray tips. Their tail is brown. Their throat and breast are gray that is usually paler on the throat. Their belly and undertail coverts are yellow with a gray tinge and a green wash on the upper flanks. They have a dark iris, a brown maxilla, a pale rufous-brown to pinkish mandible, and blackish legs and feet.

Subspecies M. s. phaeonotus has very dark smoky gray upperparts and a completely black bill. M. s. pelzelni has purer olive-green upperparts and a slightly paler throat and underparts than the nominate. M. s. ferocior is the palest subspecies but has a darker face than the nominate. Its upperparts are light olive-green and its underparts a purer, less gray, yellow than the nominate's.

== Distribution and habitat ==
Swainson's flycatcher is found in most of South America east of the Andes at some time of year. Its overall range extends from western Venezuela south through eastern Colombia, eastern Ecuador, eastern Peru, northern and eastern Bolivia, and into Argentina as far as La Pampa and Buenos Aires provinces. It extends east through Guyana into Suriname and throughout Brazil, Paraguay, and Uruguay. Subspecies M. s. phaeonotus is found year-round in southern and eastern Venezuela, western Guyana, and northern Brazil in the upper watersheds of the Negro and Branco rivers. Subspecies M. s. pelzelni is found year-round northern and eastern Bolivia and east through Brazil between the Amazon Basin to the north and northern Mato Grosso do Sul, southern Goiás, and central Minas Gerais in the south. A small isolated population of Pelzelni is found year-round in Peru's northern Cuzco Department. The ranges of the other two subspecies are discussed in the Movement section below. The map includes French Guiana but the South American Classification Committee of the American Ornithological Society has no records in that country. The SACC has records of vagrancy to Aruba and Trinidad.

Swainson's flycatcher inhabits a wide variety of landscapes, and sometimes different ones in the breeding and non-breeding seasons. Most are somewhat open and include clearings in extensive forest, wooded cerrado and savanna, scrublands, and riparian zones. The nominate subspecies has been found in relatively small forest fragments including some in urban areas. It occurs in mangroves during the non-breeding season. In the non-breeding season in Venezuela it is also found in várzea and terra firme forest. During the non-breeding season in Colombia and Ecuador, subspecies M. s. ferocior inhabits shrubby clearings, river islands, and the edges of rivers and lakes. In Peru it is found in the canopy and edges of rainforest.

In elevation Swainson's flycatcher ranges from sea level to 1,800 m (5,900 ft) in Brazil. In Venezuela resident birds reach 1,800 m (5,900 ft) on tepuis in the southeast but migrants are found only up to about 300 m (1,000 ft) in the west. It is found below 500 m (1,600 ft) in Colombia and mostly below 400 m (1,300 ft) in Ecuador. The small year-round population in Peru is at about 1,000 m (3,300 ft); migrants reach only 600 m (2,000 ft).

== Behavior ==
=== Movement ===
Subspecies M. s. phaeonotus and M. s. pelzelni of Swainson's flycatcher are non-migratory. The two southerly subspecies are migrants. M. s. ferocior breeds in southeastern Bolivia, western Paraguay, and Argentina south to La Pampa and Buenos Aires provinces. In the non-breeding season it moves north into the central and western Amazon Basin in Brazil, southern Colombia, Ecuador, and Peru. The nominate M. s. swainsoni breeds from southeastern Paraguay and Brazil's São Paulo and Rio de Janeiro states south through Uruguay into northeastern Venezuela's Misiones Province. It migrates north with some individuals reaching eastern Colombia, western Venezuela.

=== Feeding ===
Swainson's flycatcher feeds on insects and fruits; migrants apparently feed on more fruit on the wintering ground than in their breeding areas. The one study that reported foraging behavior found that in Peru most prey was captured from vegetation while briefly hovering after a short sally from a perch. Smaller amounts were captured in mid-air and by grabbing from vegetation without hovering.

=== Breeding ===
The nominate subspecies and M. s. ferocior breed from November into January. M. s. phaeonotus breeds between February and May and M. s. pelzelni between September and December. The species' nest is a bowl of moss and dry plant fibers. It is usually placed in a cavity in a tree though sometimes under a building's eave or in a nest box. The nominate's clutch is three to four eggs. The other subspecies' clutch sizes and the species' incubation period, time to fledging, and details of parental care are not known.

=== Vocalization ===
The dawn song of Swainson's flycatcher is "alternated mournful whistles, huit notes and more complex phrases". Its typical call is also a mournful whistle.

== Status ==
The IUCN has assessed Swainson's flycatcher as being of Least Concern. It has a very large range; its population size is not known and is believed to be stable. No immediate threats have been identified. It is a common breeder and less common year-round resident in Brazil. In Venezuela it is fairly common south of the Orinoco River and "spotty" north of it. It is "uncommon or unrecorded" in Colombia, "scarce" in Ecuador, and "uncommon" in Peru. It "[o]ccurs in at least twelve national parks and many other protected areas throughout its very large range [and can] live a reasonably wide range of wooded habitats, and thought unlikely to be at any risk in the near future".
