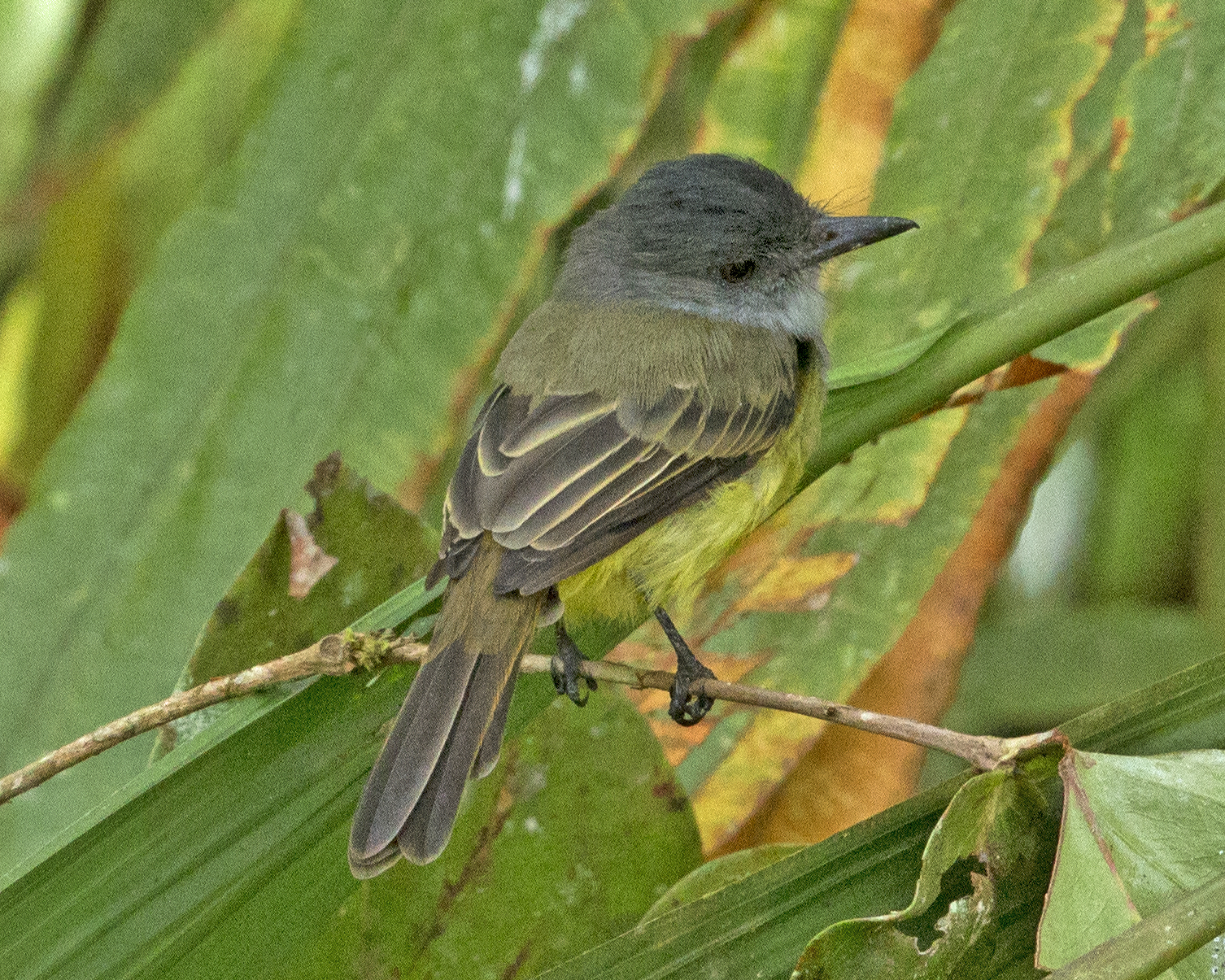

Conservation status
- Least Concern (IUCN 3.1)

Scientific classification
- Kingdom: Animalia
- Phylum: Chordata
- Class: Aves
- Order: Passeriformes
- Family: Tyrannidae
- Genus: Myiarchus
- Species: M. phaeocephalus

Binomial name
- Myiarchus phaeocephalus Sclater, PL, 1860

= Sooty-crowned flycatcher =

Species of bird

The sooty-crowned flycatcher (Myiarchus phaeocephalus) is a species of bird in the family Tyrannidae, the tyrant flycatchers. It is found in Ecuador and Peru.

== Taxonomy and systematics ==
The sooty-crowned flycatcher has two subspecies, the nominate M. p. phaeocephalus (Sclater, PL, 1860) and M. p. interior (Zimmer, JT, 1938).

== Description ==
The sooty-crowned flycatcher is 18 to 19 cm (7.1 to 7.5 in) long and weighs 24 to 29.5 g (0.85 to 1.0 oz). The sexes have the same plumage. Adults of the nominate subspecies have a light blue-gray forehead and forecrown that darkens on the hindcrown and nape; the crown has a slight crest and slightly darker center feathers that give a streaked appearance. Their face is otherwise a slightly paler gray. Their back is light olive-green and separated from the nape by a light gray "collar". The collar is unique among Myiarchus. Their wings are mostly brownish olive with pale yellowish edges on the tertials. The wing's greater and median coverts have slightly lighter tips that show as two faint wing bars. Their tail is brownish olive with paler, somewhat yellowish olive, outer webs on the outermost feathers. Their throat and breast are gray that is slightly paler on the throat. Their belly and undertail coverts are light yellow. Subspecies M. p. interior has a slightly browner crown and back and slightly richer yellow belly than the nominate. Both subspecies have a dark iris, a dark bill, and dark legs and feet.

== Distribution and habitat ==
The sooty-crowned flycatcher has a disjunct distribution. The nominate subspecies has the larger range of the two. It is found from northwestern Esmeraldas Province in northwestern Ecuador south through western Ecuador into northwestern Peru as far as Lambayeque Department. Subspecies M. p. interior is found in the upper watershed of the Marañón River from southern Zamora-Chinchipe Province in extreme southeastern Ecuador south into northern Peru's Cahamarca and Amazonas departments. The species primarily inhabits rather dry deciduous woodland and arid scrublands, and to a lesser degree the edge of mangrove forest. In elevation it ranges from sea level to 1,100 m (3,600 ft) in Ecuador and to 1,200 m (3,900 ft) in Peru.

== Behavior ==
=== Movement ===
The sooty-crowned flycatcher is believed to be a year-round resident.

=== Feeding ===
The sooty-crowned flycatcher feeds on insects that it captures with sallies from a perch.

=== Breeding ===
The sooty-crowned flycatcher breeds between February and April. Its nest is in a tree cavity lined with fur, snake skin, and plastic. The mean clutch is four eggs. Nothing else is known about the species' breeding biology.

=== Vocalization ===
The sooty-crowned flycatcher's song is a whistled note combined with "low burry tr-ret notes"; another song is "a descending wheeé-deee-deee-de-du-du". Its primary call is "a querulous freeee? or whreee?".

== Status ==
The IUCN has assessed the sooty-crowned flycatcher as being of Least Concern. It has a large range; its population size is not known and is believed to be decreasing. No immediate threats have been identified. It is considered uncommon to fairly common overall and uncommon in Peru. It occurs in several protected areas in Ecuador and in at least one in Peru though none are in the Marañón Valley. Much of its woodland habitat has been cleared but its "ability to live in scrub habitat should aid its future survival".
