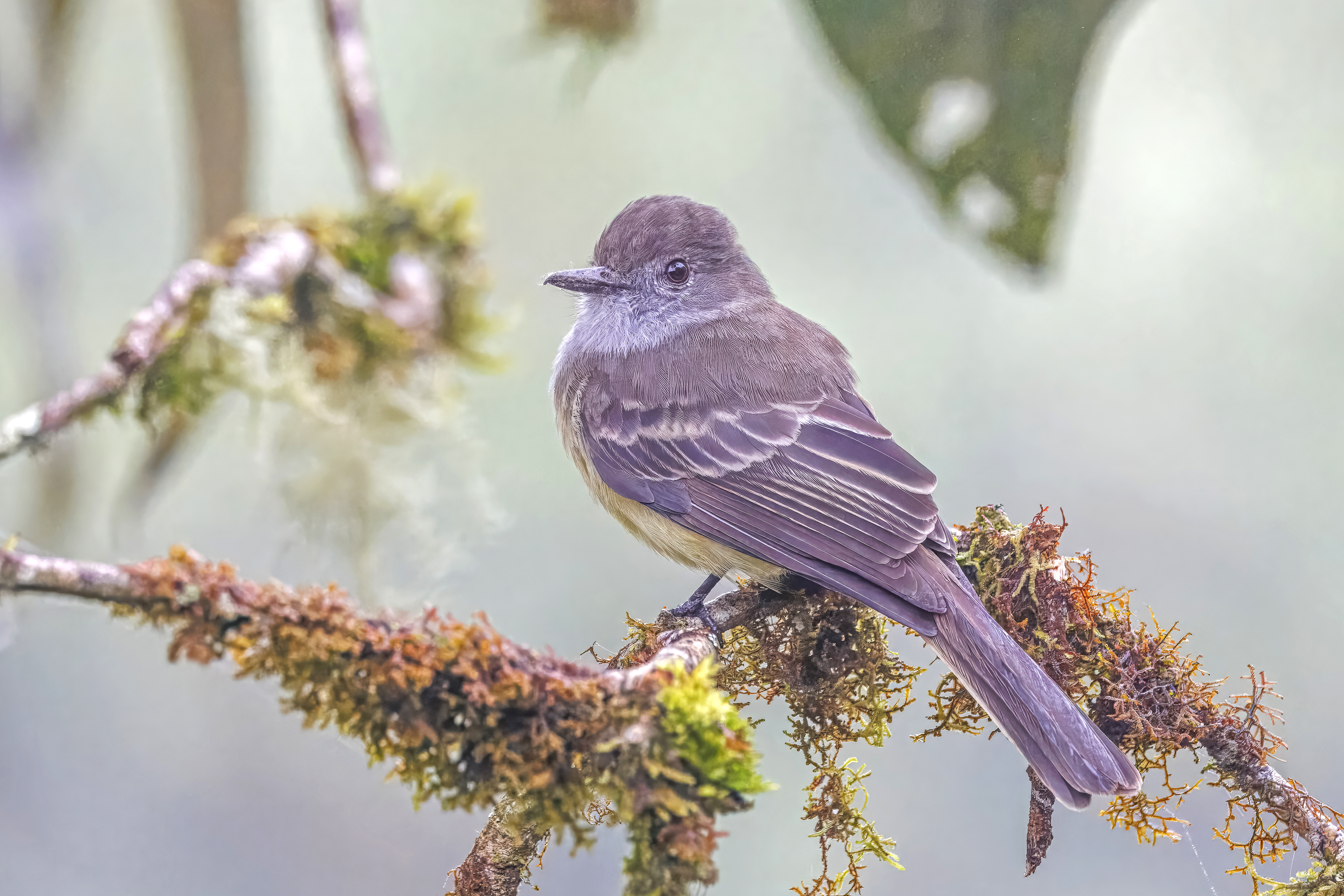
- M. c. cephalotes, Ecuador

Conservation status
- Least Concern (IUCN 3.1)

Scientific classification
- Kingdom: Animalia
- Phylum: Chordata
- Class: Aves
- Order: Passeriformes
- Family: Tyrannidae
- Genus: Myiarchus
- Species: M. cephalotes

Binomial name
- Myiarchus cephalotes Taczanowski, 1880

= Pale-edged flycatcher =

Species of bird

The pale-edged flycatcher (Myiarchus cephalotes) is a species of bird in the family Tyrannidae, the tyrant flycatchers. It is found in Bolivia, Colombia, Ecuador, Peru, and Venezuela.

== Taxonomy and systematics ==
The pale-edged flycatcher has two subspecies, the nominate M. c. cephalotes (Taczanowski, 1880) and M. c. caribbaeus (Hellmayr, 1925).

== Description ==
The pale-edged flycatcher is 18 to 19 cm (7.1 to 7.5 in) long and weighs about 22 to 31 g (0.78 to 1.1 oz). The sexes have the same plumage. Adults of the nominate subspecies have a brownish olive crown; the crown has a slight crest and slightly darker center feathers that give a streaked appearance. Their face is otherwise pale gray. Their upperparts are olive-green. Their wings are mostly brownish olive with pale whitish to yellow outer edges on the secondaries and tertials. The wing's greater and median coverts have yellowish outer edges and tips; the latter show as two wing bars. Their tail is brownish olive with whitish outer webs of the outermost feathers. This pattern is unique to this species among Myiarchus and gives it its English name. Their throat and breast are gray that is slightly paler on the throat. Their belly and undertail coverts are yellow that is somewhat richer in the middle. Subspecies M. c. caribbaeus is smaller than the nominate with even paler outer webs on the tail feathers. Both subspecies have a dark iris, a dark bill, and dark legs and feet. Juveniles have rufous edges on the wing coverts and tail feathers.

== Distribution and habitat ==
The nominate subspecies of the pale-edged flycatcher has by far the larger range. It is found in all three ranges of the Colombian Andes and south through Ecuador and Peru on the eastern Andean slope into Bolivia to western Santa Cruz Department. Subspecies M. c. caribbaeus is found only in Venezuela and has four separate populations. From west to east they are in the Andes of Trujillo and Lara states; in the Coastal Range in Aragua, the Federal District, and probably northern Monagas; in the mountains along the Guárico-Aragua border; and in the mountains of Sucre.

The pale-edged flycatcher inhabits partially open landscapes in the subtropical and lower temperate zones. These include the edges and clearings of moist and humid forest and open woodlands. In elevation it ranges between 1,400 and 2,100 m (4,600 and 6,900 ft) and probably lower in Venezuela, between 1,500 and 2,500 m (4,900 and 8,200 ft) in Colombia, mostly between 1,000 and 2,200 m (3,300 and 7,200 ft) in Ecuador, and between 1,100 and 2,600 m (3,600 and 8,500 ft) in Peru.

== Behavior ==
=== Movement ===
The pale-edged flycatcher is believed to be a year-round resident.

=== Feeding ===
The pale-edged flycatcher feeds on insects and the seeds of berries. It takes most food from foliage and branches while briefly hovering; it also takes insects in mid-air.

=== Breeding ===
The pale-edged flycatcher breeds between April and June in Venezuela and Colombia; its breeding season elsewhere is not known. Its nest has not been described but some observations suggest that it is made from plant fibers and placed in a tree cavity. Nothing else is known about the species' breeding biology.

=== Vocalization ===
The pale-edged flycatcher's dawn song is described as "a mellow, descending series of whistles: PEE pew-pew-pew-pew" and its calls as "a single, loud KIP!...a quiet, descending du-HEER [and] mellow, rolling chatters". Another description of the song is "a fast piyp! peeyur followed by several peer notes" and a call as "a loud, clear pip or piup repeated over and over".

== Status ==
The IUCN has assessed the pale-edged flycatcher as being of Least Concern. It has a large range; its population size is not known and is believed to be stable. No immediate threats have been identified. It is considered "uncommon to fairly common" in Venezuela, "common" in Colombia, and "uncommon but widely distributed" in Peru. It occurs in several protected areas across its range. "Given its flexibility in habitat choice and its relatively large range, this species is not at any risk."
