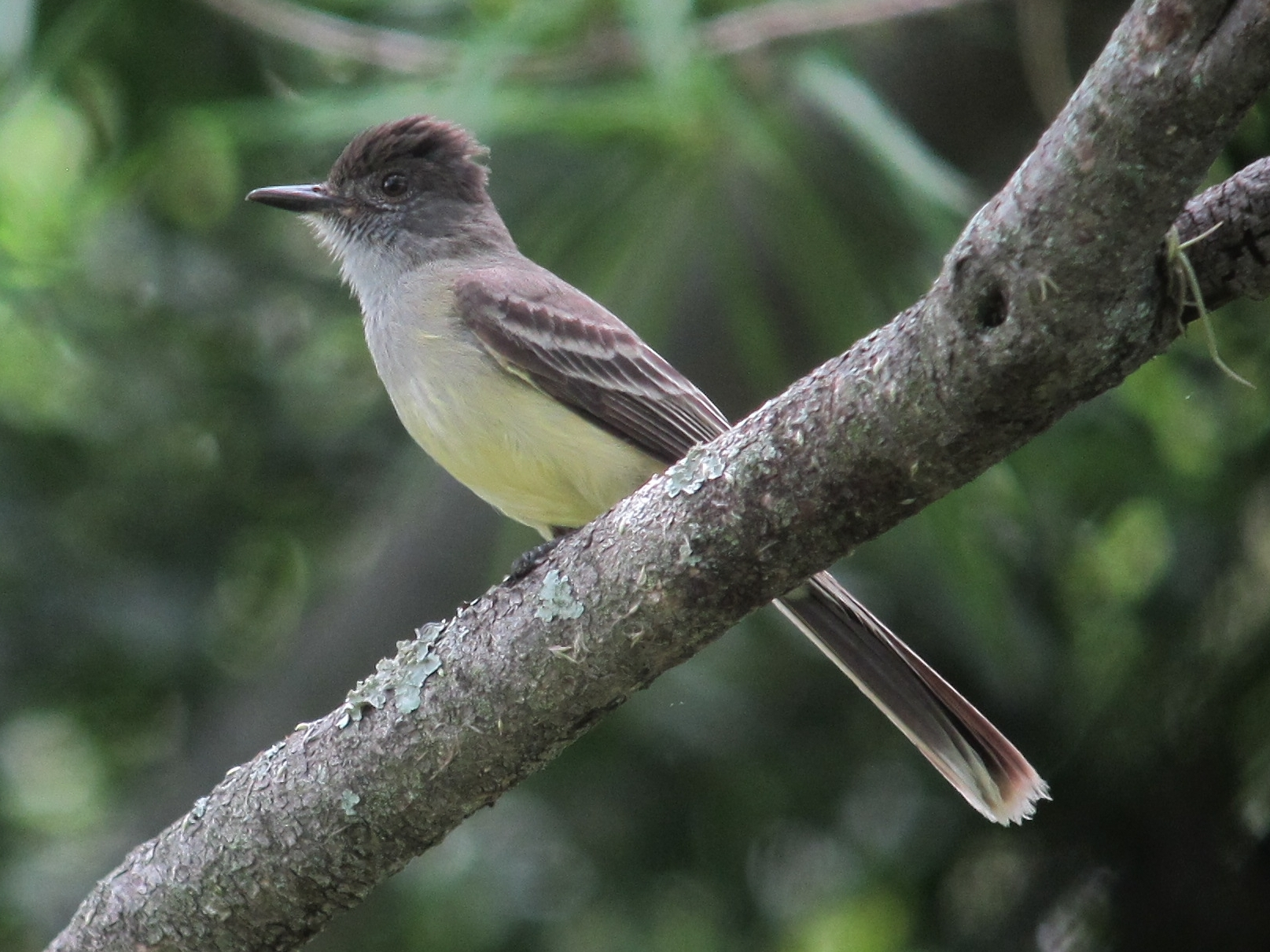

Conservation status
- Least Concern (IUCN 3.1)

Scientific classification
- Kingdom: Animalia
- Phylum: Chordata
- Class: Aves
- Order: Passeriformes
- Family: Tyrannidae
- Genus: Myiarchus
- Species: M. apicalis

Binomial name
- Myiarchus apicalis Sclater, PL & Salvin, 1881

= Apical flycatcher =

Species of bird

The apical flycatcher (Myiarchus apicalis) is a species of bird in the family Tyrannidae, the tyrant flycatchers. It is endemic to Colombia.

== Taxonomy and systematics ==
The apical flycatcher was formally described in 1881 by the English zoologist Philip Sclater. The genus name derives the Ancient Greek muia - fly, and arkhos - ruler or chief. The species' English name and specific epithet come from the Latin apical - of the point or tip - in reference to the white tips of the bird's tail feathers.

The apical flycatcher is monotypic.

== Description ==
The apical flycatcher is a typical representative of the Myiarchus flycatchers: a slim, medium-sized bird with few really distinctive features. It is 17 to 18 cm (6.7 to 7.1 in) long and weighs 26 to 33.5 g (0.92 to 1.2 oz). The sexes have the same plumage. Adults have a brownish olive crown; the crown has a slight crest and darker center feathers that give a streaked appearance. Their face is otherwise gray. Their upperparts are darkish olive. Their wings are mostly brownish with pale whitish to yellow outer edges on the secondaries and tertials and faint yellowish outer edges on the innermost primaries. The wing's greater and median coverts have whitish to yellowish outer edges and tips; the latter show as two wing bars. Their tail is brownish with pale creamy tips on all but the central pair of feathers. Their throat and breast are gray that is whiter on the throat; the sides of the breast have an olive wash. Their belly and undertail coverts are yellowish. They have a dark iris, a dark bill, and dark legs and feet. Juveniles have rufous edges on the wing coverts and tail feathers.

== Distribution and habitat ==
The apical flycatcher has a disjunct distribution in the watersheds of four west-central Colombian rivers. They are the Cauca River valley from Antioquia Department south to Cauca Department, the upper Dagua River valley in Valle del Cauca Department, the upper Patía River valley in Nariño Department, and the Magdalena River valley from Santander and Boyacá departments south to Huila Department. The species primarily inhabits dry to arid valleys with scrubby vegetation. It also occurs at the edges of forest and woodlands, in riparian areas with trees and brush, and in agricultural areas. In elevation it ranges at least from 400 to 2,300 m (1,300 to 7,500 ft) and perhaps up to 2,500 m (8,200 ft). It is most numerous below 1,700 m (5,600 ft).

== Behavior ==
=== Movement ===
The apical flycatcher is a year-round resident.

=== Feeding ===
The apical flycatcher feeds on insects and fruit. It typically forages singly or in pairs, taking prey and fruit with sallies from a perch between the habitat's low and mid-levels.

=== Breeding ===
The apical flycatcher's breeding season has not been defined. Egg laying has been observed in July, September, and between November and February. The only well-described nests were in nest boxes in a suburban area. They were made from dry grass and fur on a platform of sticks and were lined with fur, feathers, plastic, and snake skin. The average clutch was 2.6 eggs. Fledging occurred 16 to 17 days after hatch. The incubation period and details of parental care are not known.

=== Vocalization ===
When confronted by a conspecific, the apical flycatcher makes "[r]epeated rolls, hiccups and whistles". One call is a sharp repeated "weet".

== Status ==
The IUCN has assessed the apical flycatcher as being of Least Concern. It has a large range; its population size is not known and is believed to be increasing. No immediate threats have been identified. It is considered locally common. It is not known to occur in any protected areas. Its population may be expanding "as secondary woodland, scrub and pasture replace cleared humid forest above 1700 m".
