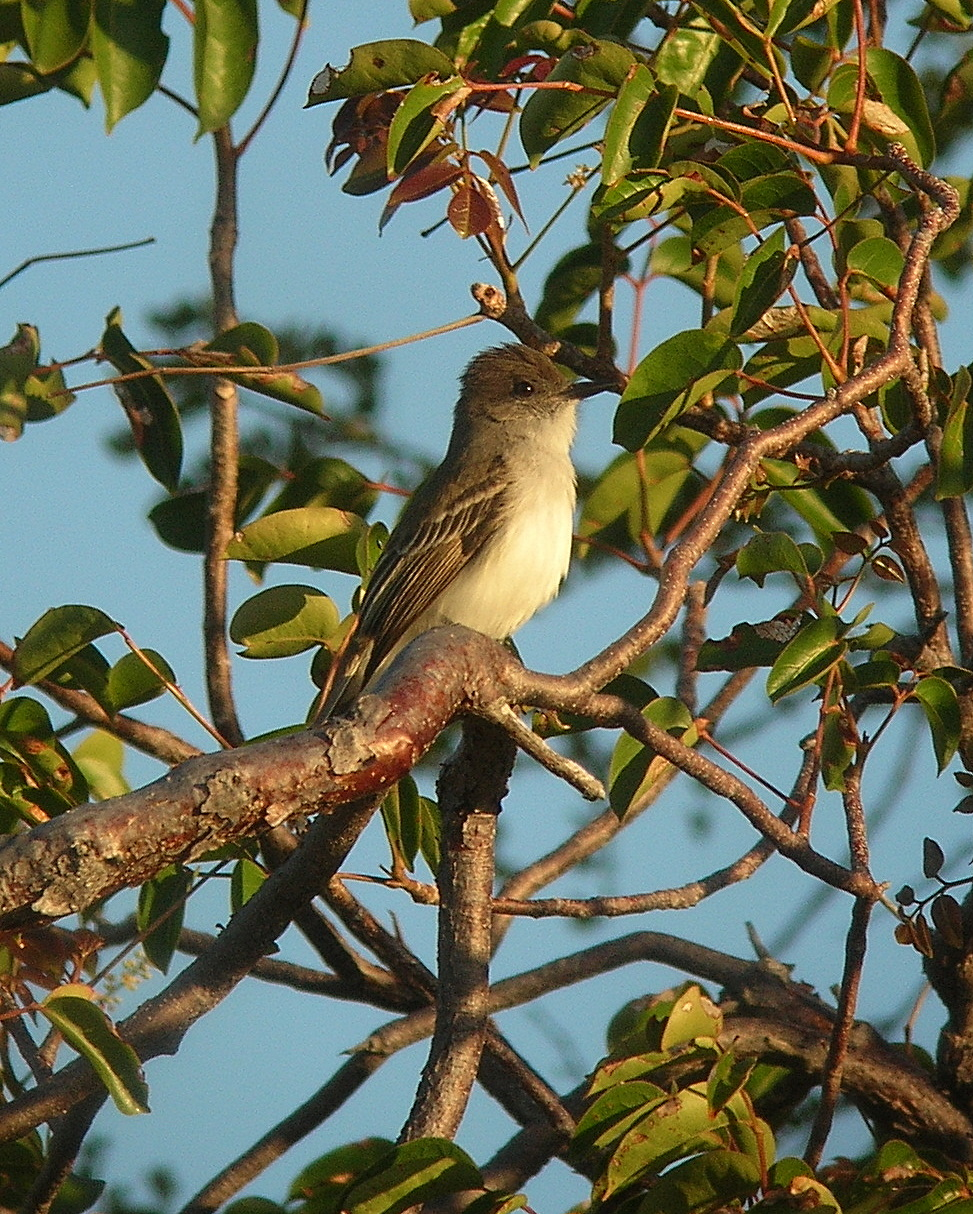

Conservation status
- Least Concern (IUCN 3.1)

Scientific classification
- Kingdom: Animalia
- Phylum: Chordata
- Class: Aves
- Order: Passeriformes
- Family: Tyrannidae
- Genus: Myiarchus
- Species: M. antillarum

Binomial name
- Myiarchus antillarum (Bryant, 1866)

Synonyms
- Tyrannus antillarum (protonym)

= Puerto Rican flycatcher =

Species of bird

The Puerto Rican flycatcher (Myiarchus antillarum) is a species of bird in the family Tyrannidae, the tyrant flycatchers. It is found in Puerto Rico, the American Virgin Islands, and the British Virgin Islands.

== Taxonomy and systematics ==
The Puerto Rican flycatcher was formally described by Dr. Henry Bryant as Tyrannus antillarum. Curiously, Bryant listed it under the subheading "Myiarchus", the genus to which it was later transferred. During the first half of the twentieth century many authors treated it as a subspecies of the stolid flycatcher (Myiarchus stolidus).

The Puerto Rican flycatcher is one of 22 species in genus Myiarchus. It is monotypic.

The local name for the Puerto Rican flycatcher is juí, and it is "traditionally considered a harbinger of both good and bad news".

== Description ==
The Puerto Rican flycatcher is about 16 to 18 cm (6.3 to 7.1 in) long and weighs 20.5 to 27.5 g (0.72 to 0.97 oz). The sexes have the same plumage. Adults have a dark sooty brown crown that forms a crest. Their face is lighter sooty brown. Their upperparts are olive-brown. Their wings are mostly olive-brown with cinnamon-buff edges on the inner webs of the flight feathers. Their tail is mostly dusky with pale feather tips. The outer feathers have pale grayish brown outer webs and the rest between them and the innermost pair have rufous-cinnamon inner webs. Their throat and breast are pale gray with an olive-brown tinge on the sides of the breast. Their belly and undertail coverts are white with usually a faint yellow tinge on the flanks and coverts. They have a brown iris, a brownish black bill with a brownish base to the mandible, and brownish black or blackish brown legs and feet.

== Distribution and habitat ==
The Puerto Rican flycatcher is found in Puerto Rico including Vieques and Culebra islands, on St. John and St. Thomas in the American Virgin Islands, and on Tortola and Virgin Gorda in the British Virgin Islands. It inhabits deciduous and pine forest, mangroves, coffee plantations, and arid scrublands. It is found in the tropical zone from sea level to 800 m (2,600 ft).

== Behavior ==
=== Movement ===
The Puerto Rican flycatcher is a year-round resident.

=== Feeding ===
The Puerto Rican flycatcher feeds on primarily on insects, fruit, and seeds. It occasionally feeds on snails and lizards. It usually forages in the forest canopy, mostly taking prey and fruit by gleaning while perched and while briefly hovering after a short sally from a perch. It also takes insects in mid-air.

=== Breeding ===
The Puerto Rican flycatcher breeds between February and July. Its nest is in a cavity, including artificial ones like nest boxes, lined with soft plant material, hair, and feathers. The clutch is three to six eggs that are cream colored with violet-gray markings. Fledging occurs 15 to 16 days after hatch. The incubation period and details of parental care are not known. The nests are frequently parasitized by shiny cowbirds (Molothrus bonariensis).

=== Vocalization ===
The most common Puerto Rican flycatcher vocalization is a "plaintive whistle whee". It also makes a "whee-a-wit-whee".

== Status ==
The IUCN has assessed the Puerto Rican flycatcher as being of Least Concern. It has a large range; its population size is not known and is believed to be decreasing. No immediate threats have been identified. It is considered common in Puerto Rico, uncommon on St. John, and rare on St. Thomas, Tortola, and Virgin Gorda. The species occurs in urban forest patches and tree and coffee plantations, "so its probable that they can coexist with humans".

== See also ==
- Fauna of Puerto Rico
- List of birds of Puerto Rico
- List of Vieques birds
- El Toro Wilderness
