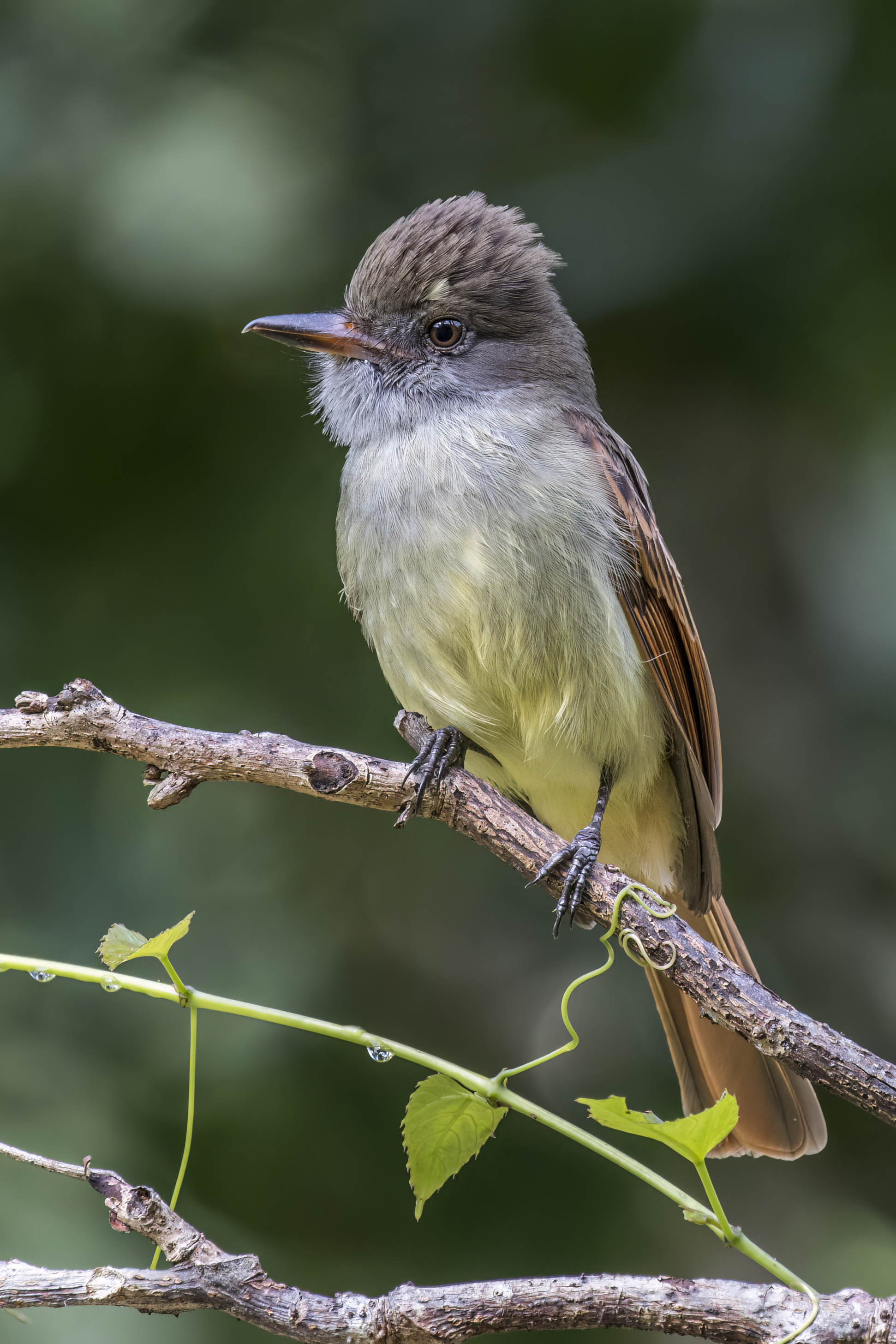
- Stewart Town, Jamaica

Conservation status
- Least Concern (IUCN 3.1)

Scientific classification
- Kingdom: Animalia
- Phylum: Chordata
- Class: Aves
- Order: Passeriformes
- Family: Tyrannidae
- Genus: Myiarchus
- Species: M. validus

Binomial name
- Myiarchus validus Cabanis, 1847

= Rufous-tailed flycatcher =

Species of bird

The rufous-tailed flycatcher (Myiarchus validus) is a species of bird in the family Tyrannidae, the tyrant flycatchers. It is endemic to Jamaica.

== Taxonomy and systematics ==
For a time the rufous-tailed flycatcher was placed in the monotypic genus Hylonax in family Cotingidae but a 2004 paper confirmed its place among the tyrant flycatchers. The rufous-tailed flycatcher has no subspecies.

== Description ==
The rufous-tailed flycatcher is a large flycatcher, about 24 cm (9.4 in) long and weighing about 39 to 43 g (1.4 to 1.5 oz). The sexes have the same plumage. Adults have a smoky brown crown whose feathers form a small crest. Their face is slaty gray. Their upperparts are mostly dull olive with a rufous tinge on the uppertail coverts. Their wings are partially dull olive with wide rufous edges on the outer webs of the primaries and secondaries. Their tertials are almost entirely rufous. The wing coverts have wide rufous tips. These combine to make the wing appear almost entirely rufous when closed. Their tail's central pair of feathers have pale rufous outer webs. The other tail feathers are mostly rufous. Their throat and breast are dark gray that blends into the yellow belly and undertail coverts. They have a dark iris, a dark bill with a paler base to the mandible, and dark legs and feet. Juveniles have whitish underparts.

== Distribution and habitat ==
The rufous-tailed flycatcher is found throughout Jamaica. It inhabits most of the available landscapes including several forest and woodland types, secondary forest, and dry scrublands. It is found at all elevations but primarily in the moister middle range between 300 and 2,000 m (1,000 and 6,600 ft).

== Behavior ==
=== Movement ===
The rufous-tailed flycatcher is a year-round resident and believed to be sedentary.

=== Feeding ===
The rufous-tailed flycatcher feeds on insects and fruits. It takes its food from dense vegetation with short sallies from a perch.

=== Breeding ===
The rufous-tailed flycatcher breeds between April and July. Its nest is made mostly from grass and leaves placed in tree cavities. The usual clutch is three or four eggs though clutches of five are known. Nothing else is known about the species' breeding biology.

=== Vocalization ===
The rufous-tailed flycatcher's song is a "fast, rolling, descending pree-ee-ee-ee-ee, like a horse's neigh". It also makes a "chi-chi-chiup".

== Status ==
The IUCN has assessed the rufous-tailed flycatcher as being of Least Concern. It has a limited range; its population size is not known and is believed to be stable. No immediate threats have been identified. It is considered fairly common. "In Jamaica, 75% of original forest cover has already been cleared, and remaining forest largely second growth; undisturbed forest survives only on high steep mountain slopes, some of which are protected in the Blue Mountain and John Crow National Park". Due to lack of funds the parks offer only nominal protection from habitat destruction and hunting.
