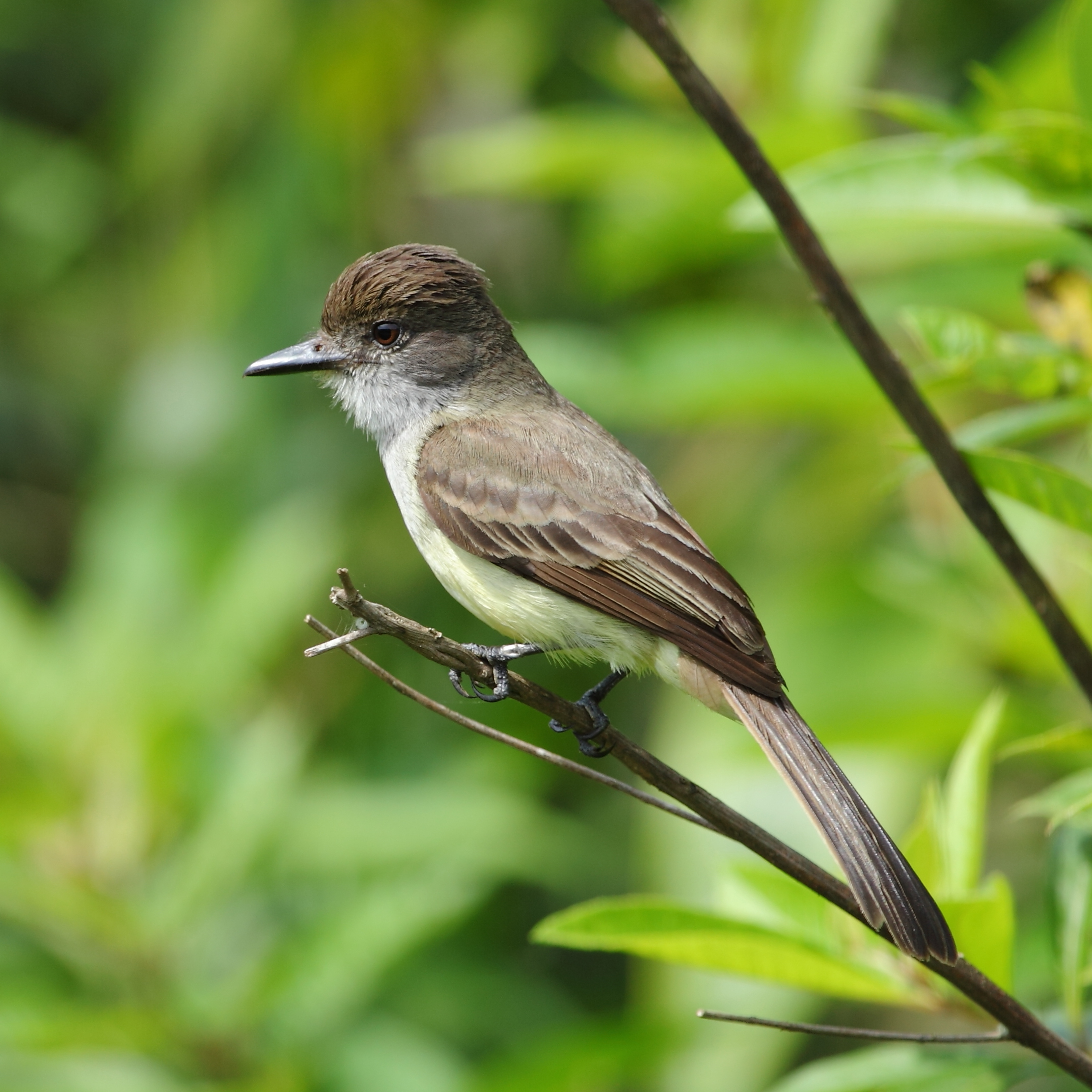
- At Bertioga, São Paulo State, Brazil

Conservation status
- Least Concern (IUCN 3.1)

Scientific classification
- Kingdom: Animalia
- Phylum: Chordata
- Class: Aves
- Order: Passeriformes
- Family: Tyrannidae
- Genus: Myiarchus
- Species: M. ferox

Binomial name
- Myiarchus ferox (Gmelin, JF, 1789)
- The species' range extends further south than shown, into northern Uruguay.

= Short-crested flycatcher =

Species of bird

The short-crested flycatcher (Myiarchus ferox) is a species of bird in the tyrant flycatcher family Tyrannidae. It is found in every mainland South American country except Chile.

== Taxonomy and systematics ==
The short-crested flycatcher was formally described in 1789 by the German naturalist Johann Friedrich Gmelin in his revised and expanded edition of Carl Linnaeus's Systema Naturae. He placed it with the Old World flycatchers in the genus Muscicapa and coined the binomial name Muscicapa ferox. The specific epithet ferox is from Latin and means "brave", "wild" or "fierce". Gmelin based his description primarily on "Le tyran de Cayenne" that had been described in 1760 by the French zoologist Mathurin Jacques Brisson. Brisson had examined both male and female specimens that had been sent to France from Cayenne.

The short-crested flycatcher is one of 22 flycatchers in the genus Myiarchus that was introduced in 1844 by Jean Cabanis. Within Myiarchus, the short-crested flycatcher is genetically closely related to the Panama flycatcher (Myiarchus panamensis).

As of early 2025 the short-crested flycatcher is assigned these three subspecies:

- M. f. brunnescens Zimmer, JT & Phelps, WH, 1946
- M. f. ferox (Gmelin, JF, 1789)
- M. f. australis Hellmayr, 1927

The variation among and within the three subspecies is complicated and in need of further study to resolve. Wide hybrid zones occur where pairs of subspecies meet.

For much of the twentieth century what are now the Panama flycatcher and Venezuelan flycatcher (M. venezuelensis) were also included as subspecies.

== Description ==
The short-crested flycatcher is about 18 cm (7.1 in) long and weighs 21 to 34 g (0.74 to 1.2 oz). The sexes have the same plumage. Adults of the nominate subspecies M. f. ferox have a smoky brown crown and upperparts; the crown has a slight crest. Their face is otherwise gray. Their wings are mostly dark brown with whitish yellow to grayish outer webs on the tertials. The wing's greater and median coverts have wide paler fuscous brown tips that show as two wing bars. Their tail is dark smoky brown with rufous edges on the feathers that quickly wear away. Their throat and breast are gray that is slightly lighter on the throat. Their belly and undertail coverts are yellow. Subspecies M. f. brunnescens has lighter brown upperparts than the nominate with wider rufous edges on the tail feathers and an olive-green wash on the flanks. M. f. australis is similar to brunnescens but with a less brown crissum. All subspecies have a dark iris, a dark bill, and dark legs and feet. Juveniles have rufous tips on the wing coverts and rufous edges on the tertials and outermost pair of tail feathers.

== Distribution and habitat ==
The nominate subspecies of the short-crested flycatcher has the largest range. It is found in the Amazon Basin from southern Colombia south through eastern Ecuador and eastern Peru into northern Bolivia and east through southern and eastern Venezuela, the Guianas, and Brazil north of the approximate line southern Mato Grosso – southern Goiás – southern Minas Gerais – central Espírito Santo. Subspecies M. f. australis is found from southeastern Bolivia east across Brazil below the above line (with much overlap) and south through Paraguay and Brazil almost to Rio Grande do Sul and into northern Argentina's Misiones and Corrientes provinces and slightly into northern Uruguay. M. f. brunnescens has a limited range in the Llanos of extreme northeastern Colombia into Venezuela from Táchira and Portuguesa east to northwestern Bolívar.

The short-crested flycatcher inhabits a variety of landscapes, most of which are somewhat open. These include clearings and edges of dense forest, várzea and igapó forest, cerrado, riparian corridors, and agricultural areas. In elevation it ranges up to 900 m (3,000 ft) in Colombia, 1,000 m (3,300 ft) in Ecuador, 1,100 m (3,600 ft) in Peru, and in Venezuela 500 m (1,600 ft) north of the Orinoco River and 1,000 m (3,300 ft) south of it.

== Behavior ==
=== Movement ===
The short-crested flycatcher is a year-round resident.

=== Feeding ===
The short-crested flycatcher feeds on insects and fruit. It forages singly or in pairs. It perches in the forest's low to mid-level and makes upward sorties to vegetation to grab its target or take it while briefly hovering.

=== Breeding ===
The two northern subspecies of the short-crested flycatcher, the nominate and M. f. brunnescens, breed mostly between July and December. The breeding season of M. f. australis has not been defined. The species' nest is made from plant material, feathers, fur, and snake skin and typically is in a tree cavity. The known clutches were of two or three eggs. The incubation period, time to fledging, and details of parental care are not known.

=== Vocalization ===
The short-crested flycatcher's song, given both at dawn and during the day, is "[s]hort, slowly vibrato-modulated whistles given infrequently". It has also been described as a "short, fine prrrrih trill". Its calls include "rasping whistles, hiccups, and sometimes strident rattles".

== Status ==
The IUCN has assessed the short-crested flycatcher as being of Least Concern. It has a large range; its population size is not known and is believed to be stable. No immediate threats have been identified. It is considered common in Colombia, fairly common in Ecuador, and common in Brazil. It is the "[m]ost common and widely distributed Amazonian Myiarchus" in Peru. It is fairly common in most of Venezuela but "spotty and less numerous" in the Llanos. It occurs in many protected areas both public and private and "[t]hrives in secondary and more open habitats".
