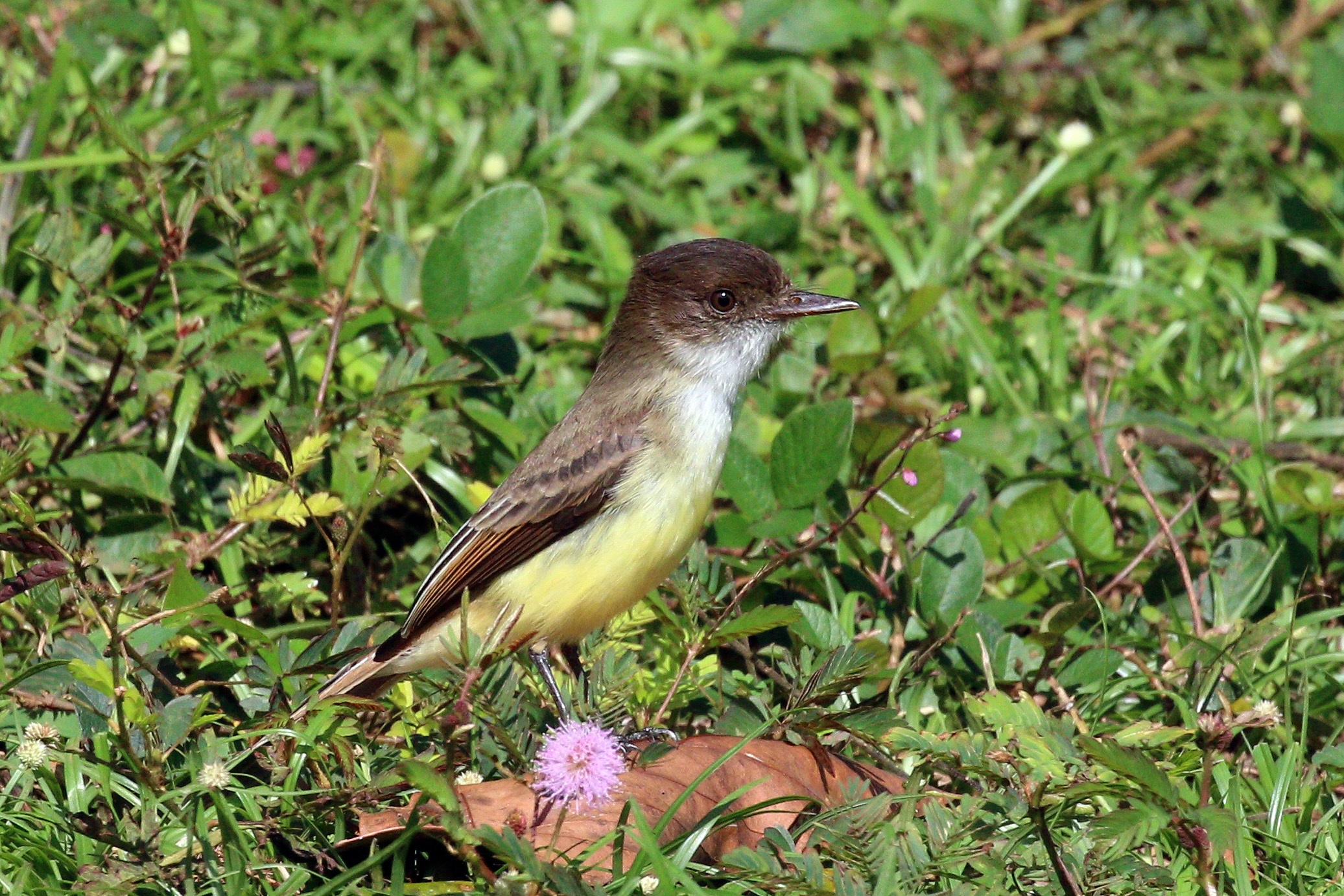
- Stewart Town, Jamaica

Conservation status
- Least Concern (IUCN 3.1)

Scientific classification
- Kingdom: Animalia
- Phylum: Chordata
- Class: Aves
- Order: Passeriformes
- Family: Tyrannidae
- Genus: Myiarchus
- Species: M. barbirostris

Binomial name
- Myiarchus barbirostris (Swainson, 1827)

= Sad flycatcher =

Species of bird

The sad flycatcher (Myiarchus barbirostris) is a species of bird in the family Tyrannidae, the tyrant flycatchers. It is endemic to Jamaica.

== Taxonomy and systematics ==
The sad flycatcher was originally described as Tyrannula barbirostris. The type specimen was mistakenly described as being taken in Mexico.

The sad flycatcher is monotypic.

== Description ==
The sad flycatcher is 16.5 to 17 cm (6.5 to 6.7 in) long and weighs 11.5 to 16 g (0.41 to 0.56 oz). The sexes have the same plumage. Adults have a smoky olive-brown crown and face; the crown feathers form a crest. Their upperparts are more olive with rufous-tinged olive-brown uppertail coverts. Their wings are mostly brown with pale grayish edges on the tertials. Their greater and median wing coverts have a rufous tinge that forms faint wing bars. Their tail is mostly brown with rufous on the outer webs of some feathers. Their throat and upper breast are gray to pale whitish and their lower breast, belly, and undertail coverts lemon-yellow. They have a dark iris, bill, and legs and feet. Juveniles have entirely gray underparts.

== Distribution and habitat ==
The sad flycatcher is found throughout most of Jamaica. It primarily inhabits lowland and montane evergreen forest and woodlands, to a lesser extent drier lowland areas and open high-elevation forest, and seldom mangroves. In elevation it ranges from sea level to 2,000 m (6,600 ft).

== Behavior ==
=== Movement ===
The sad flycatcher is a year-round resident on the island but tends to concentrate at middle elevations in the non-breeding season.

=== Feeding ===
The sad flycatcher feeds on small insects. It typically perches about 3 to 9 m (10 to 30 ft) above the ground and makes sallies to grab prey from foliage. It often returns to the same perch.

=== Breeding ===
The sad flycatcher breeds between April and June. Its nest is made from plant material placed in a cavity such as an old woodpecker hole. The usual clutch is three to four eggs. The incubation period, time to fledging, and details of parental care are not known.

=== Vocalization ===
The sad flycatcher's call is an emphatic "pip, pip-pip". It also sometimes makes a pip-pip-piree" that rises at the end.

== Status ==
The IUCN has assessed the sad flycatcher as being of Least Concern. It has a small range; its population size is not known and is believed to be stable. No immediate threats have been identified. It is considered "widespread and common". "In Jamaica, 75% of original forest cover [as been] already eliminated, and remaining forest [is] largely second growth." It is found in two national parks "but hunting and habitat destruction continue because of lack of funds for protection and management".
