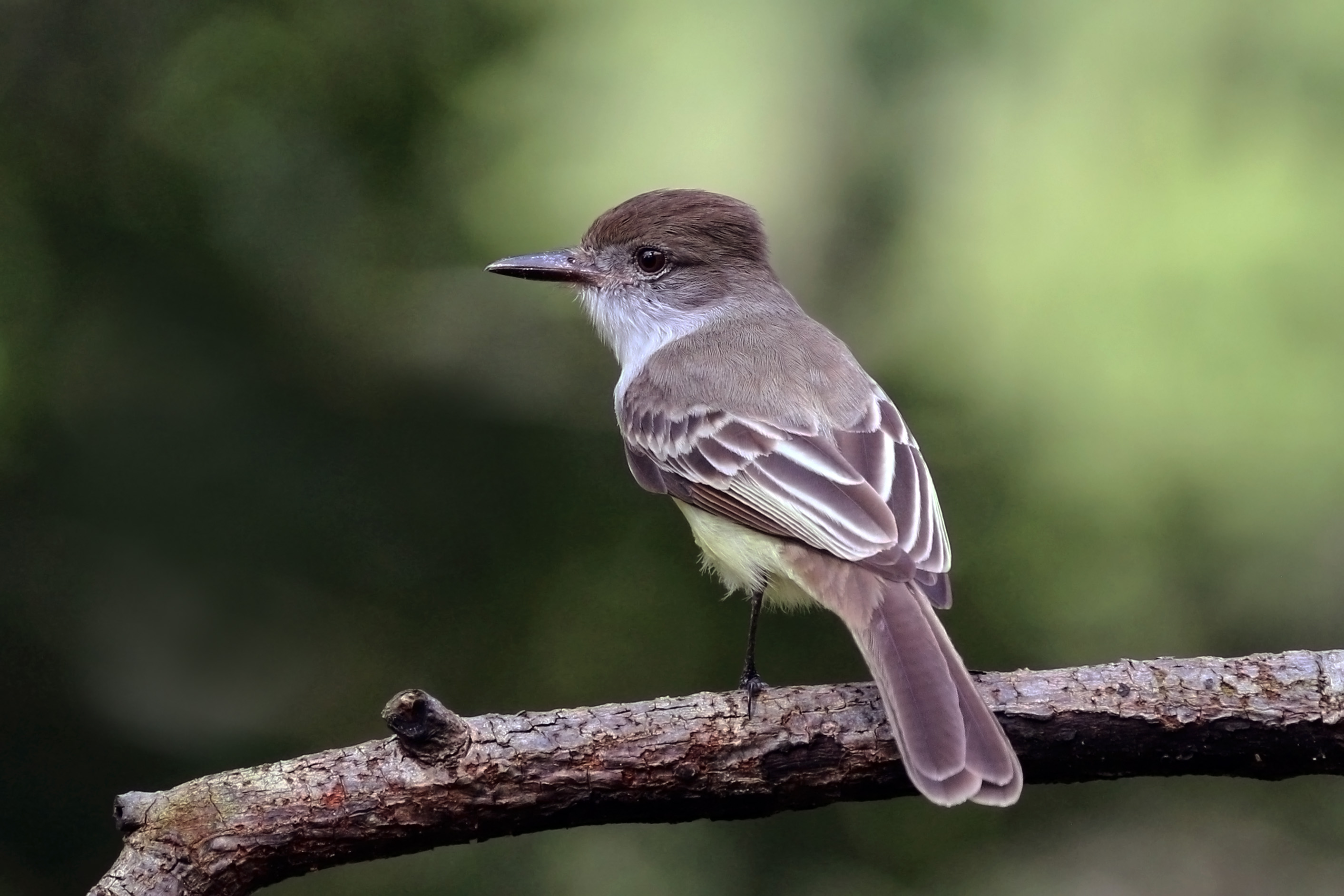
- Nominate subspecies in Stewart Town, Jamaica

Conservation status
- Least Concern (IUCN 3.1)

Scientific classification
- Kingdom: Animalia
- Phylum: Chordata
- Class: Aves
- Order: Passeriformes
- Family: Tyrannidae
- Genus: Myiarchus
- Species: M. stolidus

Binomial name
- Myiarchus stolidus (Gosse, 1847)

= Stolid flycatcher =

Species of bird

The stolid flycatcher (Myiarchus stolidus) is a species of bird in the family Tyrannidae, the tyrant flycatchers. It is found on the Caribbean islands of Hispaniola (the Dominican Republic, and Haiti) and Jamaica.

== Taxonomy and systematics ==
The stolid flycatcher was formally described as Myiobius stolidus. At various times it has been considered conspecific with each of La Sagra's flycatcher (Myiarcus sagrae) and the Puerto Rican flycatcher (M. antillarum).

The stolid flycatcher has two subspecies: the nominate M. s. stolidus (Gosse, 1847), which is endemic to Jamaica, and M. s. dominicensis (Bryant, 1867), which is endemic to Hispaniola. This treatment might not be final, as there is evidence that the nominate is more closely related to the nominate subspecies of La Sagra's flycatcher than to M. s. dominicensis.

== Description ==
The stolid flycatcher is 20 cm (7.9 in) long and weighs about 19 to 26 g (0.67 to 0.92 oz). The sexes have the same plumage. Adults of the nominate subspecies have an olive-green crown that has a small crest. Their face is dark gray. Their upperparts are mostly olive-green with slightly lighter uppertail coverts. Their wings are mostly brown with thin rufous edges on the primaries and pale grayish white edges on the outer webs of the secondaries and tertials. The wing's greater and median coverts have wide pale grayish white tips that show as two clear wing bars. Their tail is mostly brown with rufous inner webs of all but the outermost feathers. Their throat and breast are pale ashen gray and their belly and undertail coverts yellow. Subspecies M. s. dominicensis has rufous on all the tail feathers. Both subspecies have a dark iris, a dark bill, and dark legs and feet.

== Distribution and habitat ==
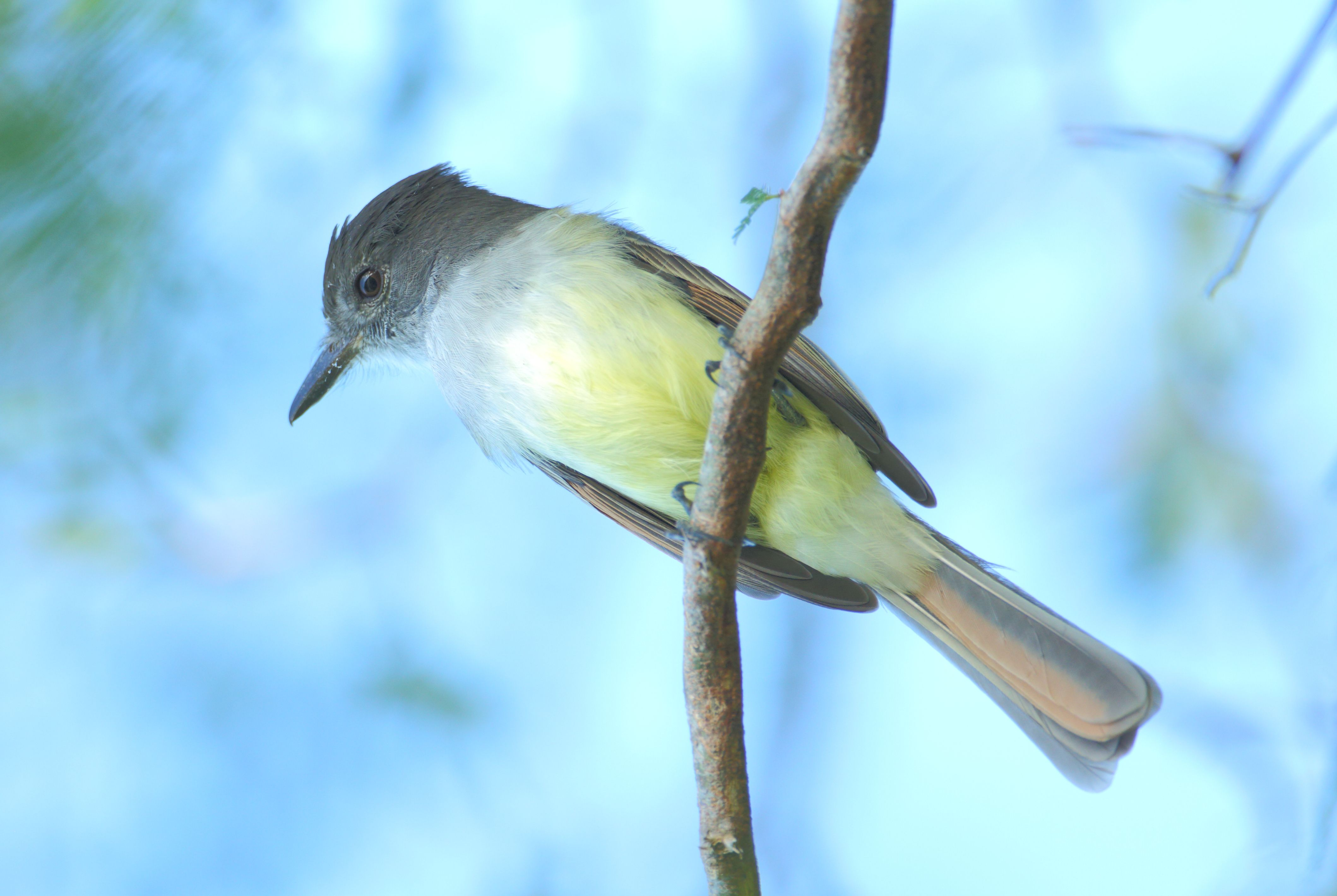
Subspecies dominicensis in La Romana, Dominican Republic

The nominate subspecies of the stolid flycatcher is endemic to Jamaica. The subspecies M. s. dominicensis is found in the Dominican Republic and Haiti, including their offshore islands; the countries share the island of Hispaniola. On both islands it is found in the tropical zone. It inhabits the interior and edges of lowland forest, drier woodlands, scrublands, and mangroves. On Hispaniola it also occurs in pine forest. Though it ranges from sea level to 1,800 m (5,900 ft) it is found less frequently in the higher elevations.

== Behavior ==
=== Movement ===
The stolid flycatcher is a year-round resident.

=== Feeding ===
The stolid flycatcher feeds on insects and fruits. It typically forages by snatching prey and fruit from vegetation while briefly hovering after a sally from a perch.

=== Breeding ===
The stolid flycatcher breeds between April and June. It nests in a cavity in a tree or in a human structure such as a house. The clutch is three to four eggs. Nothing else is known about the species' breeding biology.

=== Vocalization ===
The stolid flycatcher's song is a "rolling whee-ee-ee, swee-ip, bzzrt". On Hispaniola it also makes a "plaintive jui".

== Status ==
The IUCN has assessed the stolid flycatcher as being of Least Concern. It has a large range; its population size is not known and is believed to be decreasing. No immediate threats have been identified. It is considered common on both islands. "Habitat loss [is] continuing throughout this species' range; problems include hurricane damage, widespread pesticide use, plantations of exotic trees, timber removal, deliberate fires, and continuing conversion for small-scale farming and urbanization."
