= George Newbold Lawrence =

American businessman and amateur ornithologist

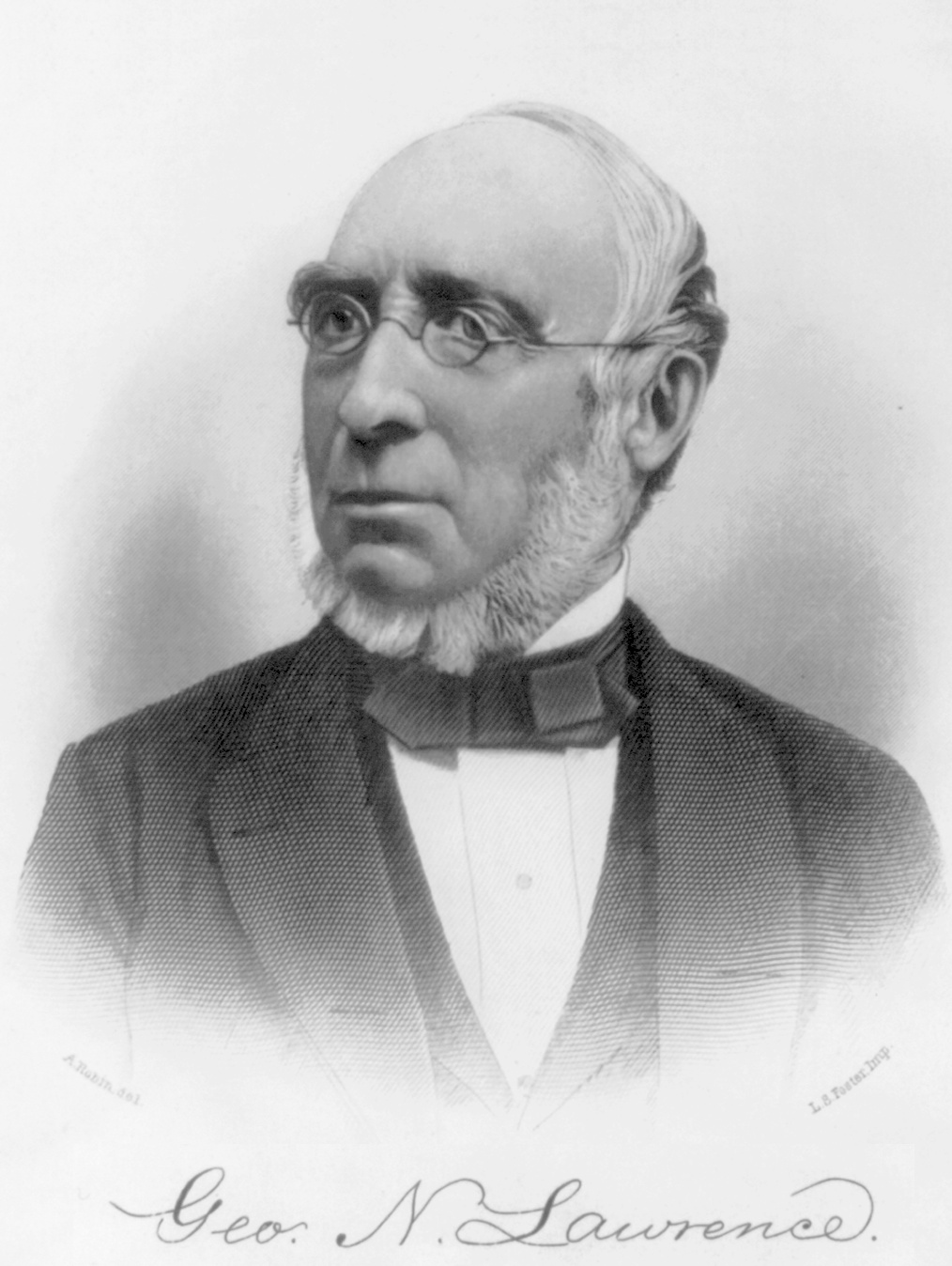
- Born: October 20, 1806; New York City, New York, U.S.
- Died: January 17, 1895 (aged 88); New York City, New York, U.S.
- Scientific career
- Fields: Businessman, ornithologist
- Author abbrev. (zoology): Lawrence

George Newbold Lawrence (October 20, 1806 – January 17, 1895) was an American businessman and amateur ornithologist.

== Early life ==
Lawrence was born in the city of New York on October 20, 1806.

From his youth, Lawrence was a lover of birds and spent much of his spare time studying their habits. At sixteen years of age, he became a clerk in his father's business, becoming a partner in his father's house by age twenty.

== Career ==
Lawrence conducted Pacific bird surveys for Spencer Fullerton Baird and John Cassin, and the three men co-authored Birds of North America in 1860.

He sold his collection of 8,000 bird skins to the American Museum of Natural History in 1887.

Fellow ornithologists honored him by naming one bird genus and 20 species after him, including both the scientific and common name of the Lawrence's goldfinch, first described by Cassin in 1852.

== Personal life ==
Lawrence died on January 17, 1895, in New York City. His funeral was held at his residence, 45 East 21st Street in Manhattan. His wife died five days later on January 22, 1895. Their combined estates totaled $528,900 which were left to their two sons, Elmen N. Lawrence and John B. Lawrence.
