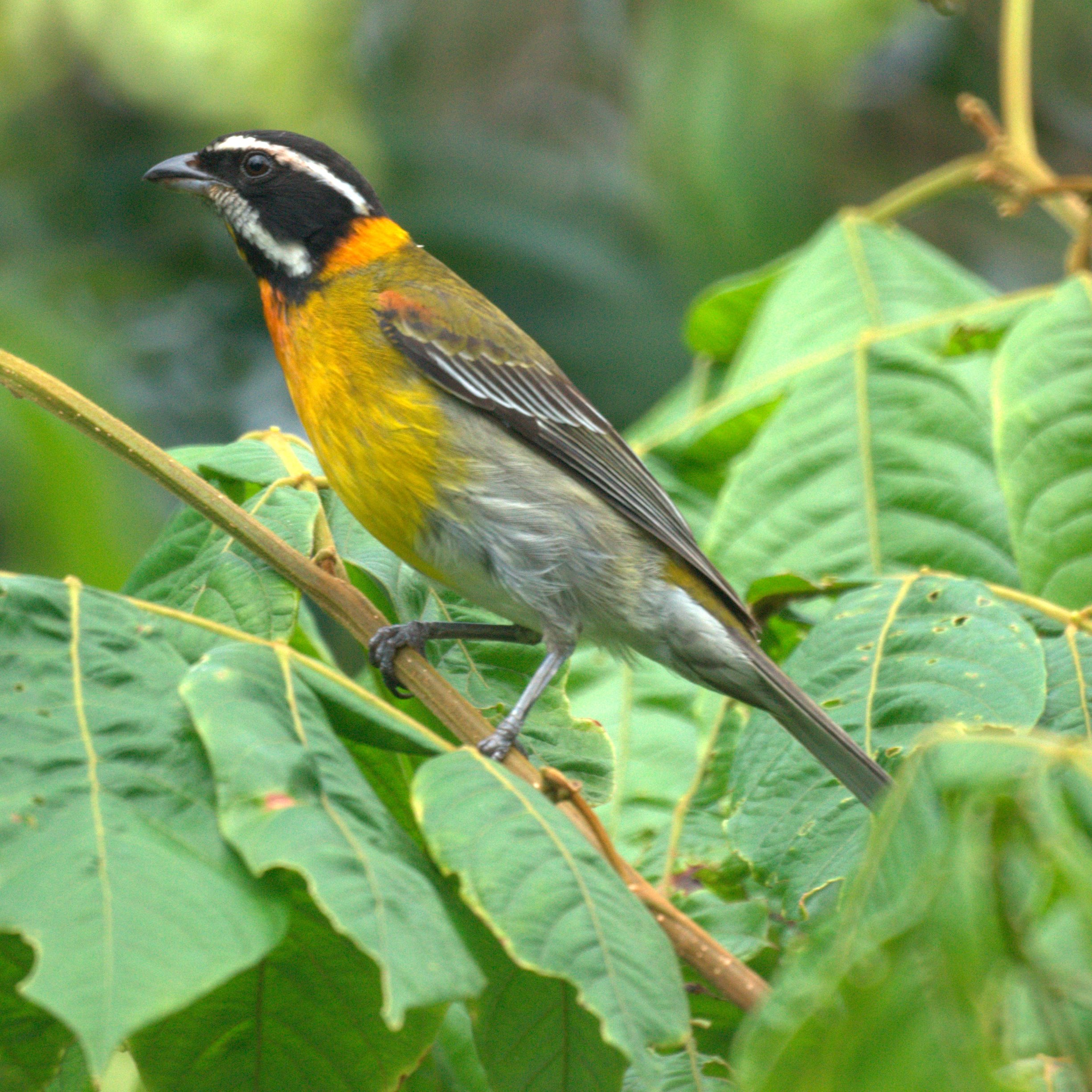
- Male
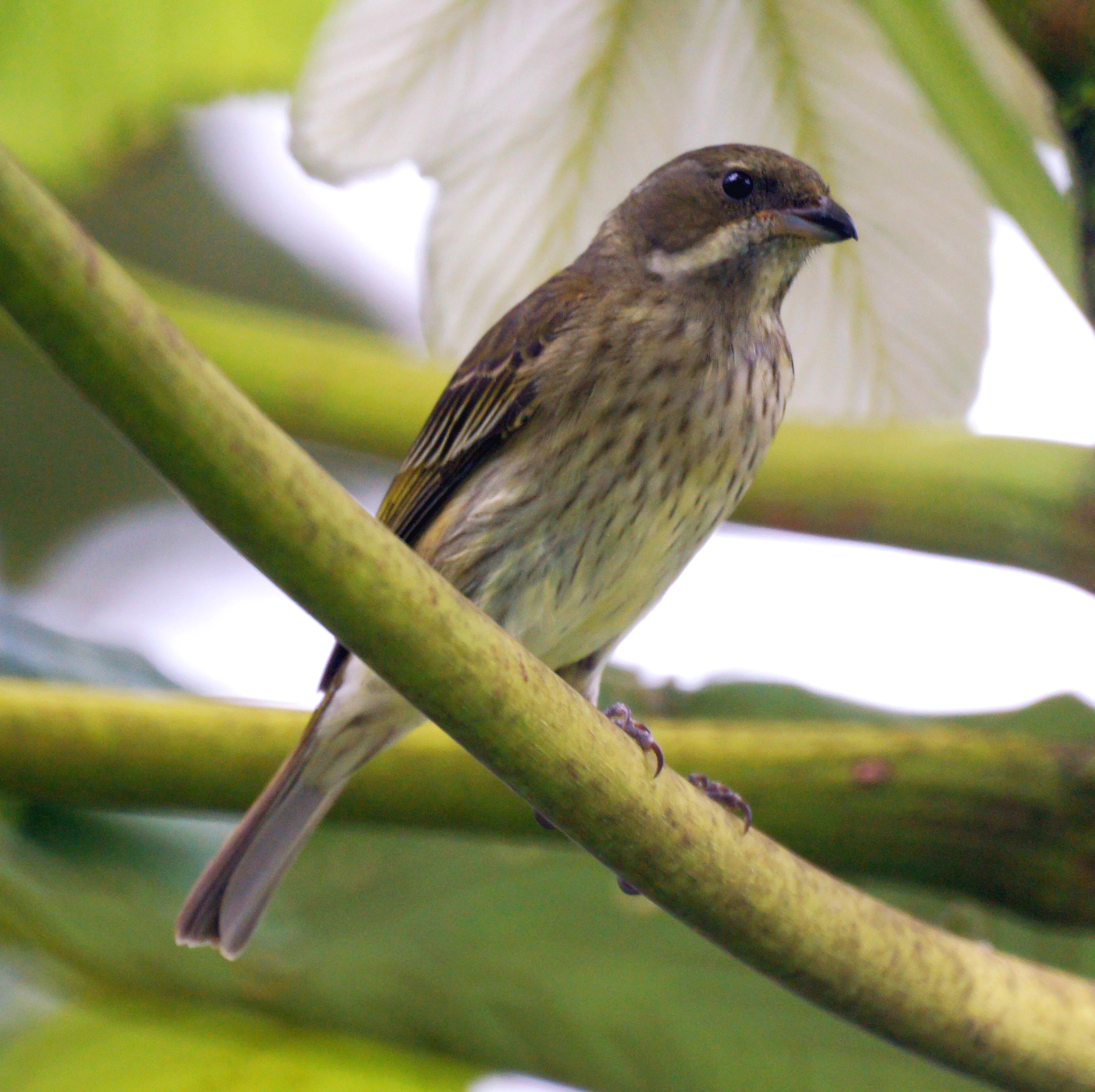
- Female

Conservation status
- Least Concern (IUCN 3.1)

Scientific classification
- Kingdom: Animalia
- Phylum: Chordata
- Class: Aves
- Order: Passeriformes
- Family: Spindalidae
- Genus: Spindalis
- Species: S. portoricensis

Binomial name
- Spindalis portoricensis (Bryant, H, 1866)

Synonyms
- Spindalis zena portoricensis

= Puerto Rican spindalis =

Species of bird

The Puerto Rican spindalis (Spindalis portoricensis) is a bird endemic to the island of Puerto Rico, where it is commonly known as reina mora or cigua puertorriqueña. The species is widely distributed throughout the island and is an important part of the Puerto Rican ecosystem because of its help in seed dispersal and plant reproduction.

== Taxonomy ==
The Puerto Rican spindalis was originally classified as Spindalis zena portoricensis, making it a subspecies of the western spindalis (Spindalis zena). In 1997, an article was published which presented an extensive analysis of the genus Spindalis. The report concluded, based on differences in weight, color, pattern, distribution, and voice, that a split of S. zena was necessary. Four distinct species were identified—Spindalis dominicensis, Spindalis nigricephala, Spindalis portoricensis and Spindalis zena. S. zena was also subdivided into five subspecies: S. z. pretrei, S. z. salvini, S. z. benedicti, S. z. townsendi and S. z. zena. Specifically, the difference in vocalization, and morphology, distinguish S. portoricensis from S. dominicensis.

== Description ==
The Puerto Rican spindalis exhibits sexual dimorphism with males being brightly colored and females being dully colored. Males are green colored above with an orange neck and chest. They have a black head with two white stripes running across it, with one above and one below the eyes. The tail and wings are gray to black with small white stripes at the tips. In contrast, the female is a dull olive-green color with slightly noticeable white stripes. Sexual dimorphism is also noticeable in weight and size. Females are slightly heavier but smaller in length than males. The male's weight ranges from 22.5 to 37.0 grams with an average of 30.8 grams while the female's ranges from 28.0 to 41.1 grams with an average of 33.5 grams. The length of the male's wings ranges from 82 to 88.5 mm with an average of 85.2 mm while the female's range from 80 to 85.5 mm with an average of 82.6 mm. The length of the male's tail ranges from 59 to 68 mm with an average of 63.3 mm while the female's range from 56 to 65.5 mm with an average of 60.6 mm.

== Distribution and habitat ==
The Puerto Rican spindalis is currently found more commonly in plantations than in their natural habitat, the forests of Maricao and the El Yunque National Forest. It may also be found in gardens, scavenging for flower nectar, and other areas where fruits are grown. It can be attracted by a sugar solution. It is distributed throughout the entire main island of Puerto Rico and is rarely found above 1,000 meters in elevation.

Bird count of the Puerto Rican spindalis (2004)

== Ecology and behavior ==
The Puerto Rican spindalis are usually found in pairs but may travel in small flocks. These birds also engage in a behavior called mobbing. This is when a flock of birds, from one or more species, attack a known predator, usually to defend their eggs or hatchlings. Such behavior has been observed being directed against the Puerto Rican boa by immature Puerto Rican spindalis. In 2006, an individual bird was reported to have exhibited "beak swinging," using its beak to navigate vines.

External audio
- Bird Call
- Puerto Rican spindalis call from Maricao State Forest
- Puerto Rican spindalis song from Maricao State Forest

The vocalization of the Puerto Rican spindalis is not as complex as that of other Spindalis species; only the songs of S. dominicensis are less elaborate. As with all Spindalis, the males emit high pitched sounds at 8 kHz or higher, usually from treetops high above the ground. Females, on the other hand, sing "whisper songs" usually from dense areas close to the ground. The most common vocalization is described as a "continuing series of high-pitched, thin, sibilant notes, given in a rhythmic pattern." Other vocalizations include a fast tweet and a short chi chi chi.

=== Diet ===
The Puerto Rican spindalis commonly eats fruit from Didymopanax morototoni, Cecropia schreberiana, Cordia sulcata, Ficus species, Phoradendron species and Inga vera trees, with fruit from S. morototoni being the most important. Because of the difficulty of digestion and the small amount of energy that fruit and leaves provide, these birds also include insects and small lizards as part of their diet.

=== Reproduction ===
The Puerto Rican spindalis builds cup-shaped nests from various plant matter. Two to four eggs are laid at a time. Eggs are usually light blue in color with brown patches around the large end, but regional variations are known to exist. They measure, on average, 24 by 17 mm.

== See also ==
- Fauna of Puerto Rico
- List of birds of Puerto Rico
- List of endemic fauna of Puerto Rico
- List of Puerto Rican birds
- List of Vieques birds
- El Toro Wilderness
