= List of birds of Vieques =

List of birds of Vieques, Puerto Rico

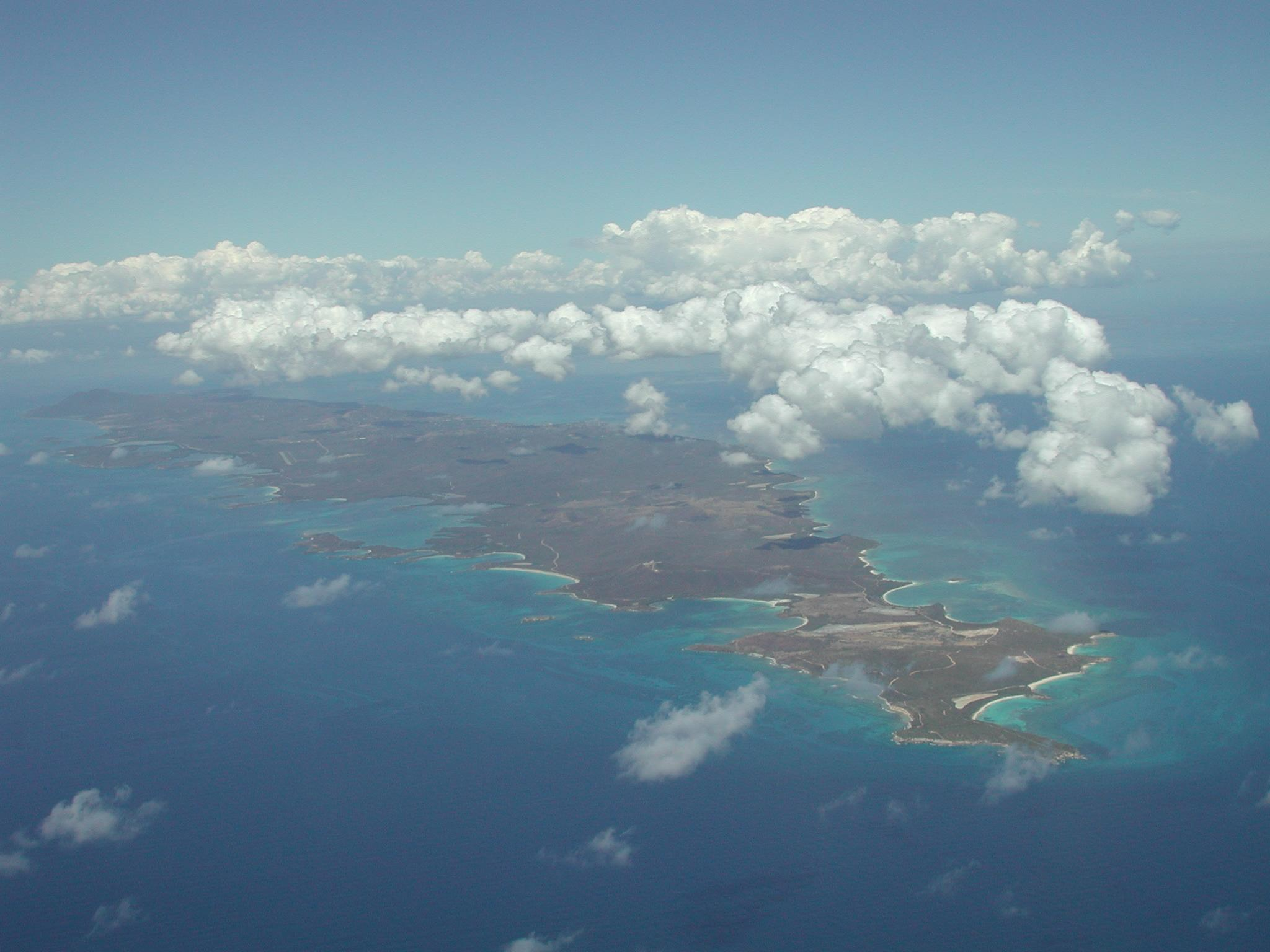
Vieques Island from the air

This is a list of birds recorded in the island of Vieques. Vieques is an island municipality of Puerto Rico located off the east coast of the main island of Puerto Rico, south of Culebra island and west of the Virgin Islands. It has a total area of 348.15 km^{2}, of which only 135 km^{2} is land area. On May 1, 2001, the western end of Vieques National Wildlife Refuge was established and on May 1, 2003, the same day as the exit of the U.S. Navy from the island, the eastern end of the refuge was established.

There are a total of 196 species recorded from the island of Vieques as of July 2022, according to Bird Checklists of the World. Some species, such as the Puerto Rican parrot, have been extirpated from the island but are, nonetheless, included in this list. This list presents the following information for each species: common and scientific name of each species.

This list is presented in the taxonomic sequence of the Check-list of North and Middle American Birds, 7th edition through the 63rd Supplement, published by the American Ornithological Society (AOS). Common and scientific names are also those of the Check-list, except that the common names of families are from the Clements taxonomy because the AOS list does not include them.

The following tags have been used to highlight several categories of occurrence:

- (A) Accidental
- (I) Introduced
- (Ex) Extirpated

== Ducks, geese, and waterfowl ==
Order: Anseriformes Family: Anatidae

Anatidae includes the ducks and most duck-like waterfowl, such as geese and swans. These birds are adapted to an aquatic existence with webbed feet, bills which are flattened to a greater or lesser extent, and feathers that are excellent at shedding water due to special oils.

Common name	Species	Status
West Indian whistling-duck	Dendrocygna arborea	
Canada goose	Branta canadensis	(A)
Blue-winged teal	Spatula discors	
Northern shoveler	Spatula clypeata	(A)
American wigeon	Mareca americana	(A)
White-cheeked pintail	Anas bahamensis	
Lesser scaup	Aythya affinis	(A)
Red-breasted merganser	Mergus serrator	(A)
Masked duck	Nomonyx dominicus	(A)
Ruddy duck	Oxyura jamaicensis	

== Guineafowl ==
Order: Galliformes Family: Numididae

Guineafowls are a group of African seed-eating, ground-nesting birds resembling partridges, but with featherless heads and spangled gray plumage.

Common name	Species	Status
Helmeted guineafowl	Numida meleagris	(I)

== New World quail ==
Order: Galliformes Family: Odontophoridae

The New World quails are small, plump terrestrial birds only distantly related to the quails of the Old World, but named for their similar appearance and habits.

Common name	Species	Status
Northern bobwhite	Colinus virginianus	(Ex)

== Flamingos ==
Order: Phoenicopteriformes Family: Phoenicopteridae

Flamingos (genus Phoenicopterus monotypic in family Phoenicopteridae) are gregarious wading birds, usually 3 to 5 feet (0.9 to 1.5 m) tall, found in both the Western and Eastern Hemispheres. Flamingos filter-feed on shellfish and algae. Their oddly shaped beaks are specially adapted to separate mud and silt from the food they consume and, uniquely, are used upside-down.

Common name	Species	Status
American flamingo	Phoenicopterus ruber	(A)

== Grebes ==
Order: Podicipediformes Family: Podicipedidae

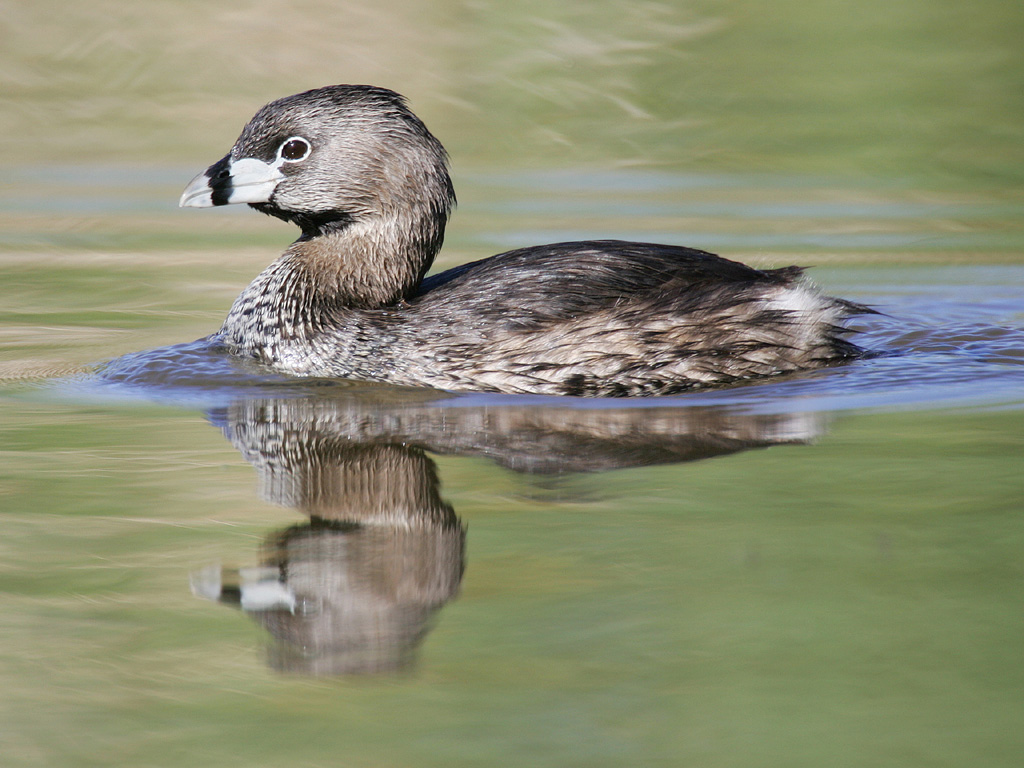
Pied-billed grebe, commonly known as zaramago in Spanish.

Grebes are small to medium-large freshwater diving birds. They have lobed toes and are excellent swimmers and divers. However, they have their feet placed far back on the body, making them quite ungainly on land.

Common name	Species	Status
Least grebe	Tachybaptus dominicus	
Pied-billed grebe	Podilymbus podiceps	

== Pigeons and doves ==
Order: Columbiformes Family: Columbidae

Pigeons and doves are stout-bodied birds with short necks and short slender bills with a fleshy cere.

Common name	Species	Status
Rock pigeon	Columba livia	(I)
Scaly-naped pigeon	Patagioenas squamosa	
White-crowned pigeon	Patagioenas leucocephala	
Eurasian collared-dove	Streptopelia decaocto	(I)
Common ground dove	Columbina passerina	
Ruddy quail-dove	Geotrygon montana	
Key West quail-dove	Geotrygon chrysia	
Bridled quail-dove	Geotrygon mystacea	
White-winged dove	Zenaida asiatica	
Zenaida dove	Zenaida aurita	
Mourning dove	Zenaida macroura	

== Cuckoos ==
Order: Cuculiformes Family: Cuculidae

The family Cuculidae includes cuckoos, roadrunners and anis. These birds are of variable size with slender bodies, long tails and strong legs. The Old World cuckoos are brood parasites.

Common name	Species	Status
Smooth-billed ani	Crotophaga ani	
Yellow-billed cuckoo	Coccyzus americanus	(A)
Mangrove cuckoo	Coccyzus minor	
Puerto Rican lizard-cuckoo	Saurothera vieilloti	(A)

== Nightjars and allies ==
Order: Caprimulgiformes Family: Caprimulgidae

Nightjars are medium-sized nocturnal birds that usually nest on the ground. They have long wings, short legs and very short bills. Most have small feet, of little use for walking, and long pointed wings. Their soft plumage is cryptically colored to resemble bark or leaves.

Common name	Species	Status
Antillean nighthawk	Chordeiles gundlachi	
Chuck-will's-widow	Antrostomus carolinensis	(A)

== Swifts ==
Order: Apodiformes Family: Apodidae

Swifts are small birds which spend the majority of their lives flying. These birds have very short legs and never settle voluntarily on the ground, perching instead only on vertical surfaces. Many swifts have long swept-back wings which resemble a crescent or boomerang.

Common name	Species	Status
White-collared swift	Streptoprocne zonaris	(A)
Chimney swift	Chaetura pelagica	(A)
Antillean palm swift	Tachornis phoenicobia	(A)

== Hummingbirds ==
Order: Apodiformes Family: Trochilidae

Hummingbirds are small birds capable of hovering in mid-air due to the rapid flapping of their wings. They are the only birds that can fly backwards.

Common name	Species	Status
Puerto Rican mango	Anthracothorax aurulentus	(A)
Green-throated carib	Eulampis holosericeus	
Puerto Rican emerald	Riccordia maugaeus	
Antillean crested hummingbird	Orthorhyncus cristatus	

== Rails, gallinules, and coots ==
Order: Gruiformes Family: Rallidae

Rallidae is a large family of small to medium-sized birds which includes the rails, crakes, coots and gallinules. The most typical family members occupy dense vegetation in damp environments near lakes, swamps or rivers. In general they are shy and secretive birds, making them difficult to observe. Most species have strong legs and long toes which are well adapted to soft uneven surfaces. They tend to have short, rounded wings and to be weak fliers.

Common name	Species	Status
Clapper rail	Rallus crepitans	
Sora	Porzana carolina	(A)
Common gallinule	Gallinula galeata	
American coot	Fulica americana	
Black rail	Laterallus jamaicensis	(A)

== Stilts and avocets ==
Order: Charadriiformes Family: Recurvirostridae

Recurvirostridae is a family of large wading birds, which includes the avocets and stilts. The avocets have long legs and long up-curved bills. The stilts have extremely long legs and long, thin, straight bills.

Common name	Species	Status
Black-necked stilt	Himantopus mexicanus	

== Oystercatchers ==
Order: Charadriiformes Family: Haematopodidae

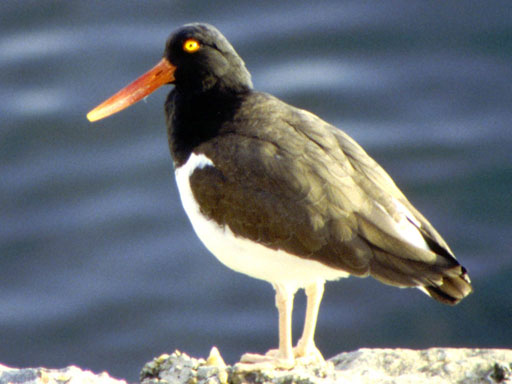
American oystercatcher, this species is a probable breeder and can be found in Vieques's shorelines.

The oystercatchers are large, obvious and noisy plover-like birds, with strong bills used for smashing or prising open molluscs.

Common name	Species	Status
American oystercatcher	Haematopus palliatus	

== Lapwings and plovers ==
Order: Charadriiformes Family: Charadriidae

The family Charadriidae includes the plovers, dotterels and lapwings. They are small to medium-sized birds with compact bodies, short, thick necks and long, usually pointed, wings. They are found in open country worldwide, mostly in habitats near water.

Common name	Species	Status
Black-bellied plover	Squatarola squatarola	
American golden-plover	Pluvialis dominica	(A)
Wilson's plover	Charadrius wilsonia	
Semipalmated plover	Charadrius semipulmatus	
Piping plover	Charadrius melodus	(A)
Killdeer	Charadrius vociferus	

== Sandpipers and allies ==
Order: Charadriiformes Family: Scolopacidae

Scolopacidae is a large diverse family of small to medium-sized shorebirds including the sandpipers, curlews, godwits, shanks, tattlers, woodcocks, snipes, dowitchers and phalaropes. The majority of these species eat small invertebrates picked out of the mud or soil. Different lengths of legs and bills enable multiple species to feed in the same habitat, particularly on the coast, without direct competition for food.

Common name	Species	Status
Whimbrel	Numenius phaeopus	(A)
Hudsonian godwit	Limosa haemastica	(A)
Ruddy turnstone	Arenaria interpres	
Red knot	Calidris canutus	(A)
Stilt sandpiper	Calidris himantopus	
Sanderling	Calidris alba	
Least sandpiper	Calidris minutilla	
White-rumped sandpiper	Calidris fuscicollis	(A)
Pectoral sandpiper	Calidris melanotos	(A)
Semipalmated sandpiper	Calidris pusilla	(A)
Western sandpiper	Calidris mauri	
Short-billed dowitcher	Limnodromus griseus	
Wilson's snipe	Gallinago delicata	(A)
Spotted sandpiper	Actitis macularius	
Solitary sandpiper	Tringa solitaria	(A)
Greater yellowlegs	Tringa melanoleuca	
Willet	Tringa semipalmata	(A)
Lesser yellowlegs	Tringa flavipes	

== Skuas and jaegers ==
Order: Charadriiformes Family: Stercorariidae

The family Stercorariidae are, in general, medium to large birds, typically with grey or brown plumage, often with white markings on the wings. They nest on the ground in temperate and arctic regions and are long-distance migrants.

Common name	Species	Status
Parasitic jaeger	Stercorarius parasiticus	(A)

== Gulls, terns, and skimmers ==
Order: Charadriiformes Family: Laridae

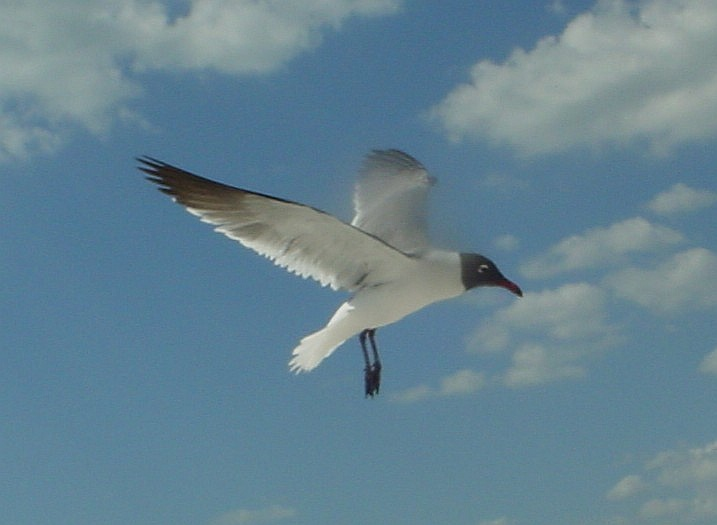
Laughing gull, the most common gull (gaviota) in the archipelago of Puerto Rico but an uncommon species in summer in Vieques.

Laridae is a family of medium to large seabirds and includes gulls, kittiwakes, terns and skimmers. They are typically gray or white, often with black markings on the head or wings. They have longish bills and webbed feet. Terns are a group of generally medium to large seabirds typically with gray or white plumage, often with black markings on the head. Most terns hunt fish by diving but some pick insects off the surface of fresh water. Terns are generally long-lived birds, with several species known to live in excess of 25–30 years.

Common name	Species	Status
Laughing gull	Leucophaeus atricilla	
Herring gull	Larus argentatus	
Lesser black-backed gull	Larus fuscus	(A)
Brown noddy	Anous stolidus	
Sooty tern	Onychoprion fuscatus	
Bridled tern	Onychoprion anaethetus	
Least tern	Sternula antillarum	
Gull-billed tern	Gelochelidon nilotica	(A)
Caspian tern	Hydroprogne caspia	(A)
Roseate tern	Sterna dougallii	
Common tern	Sterna hirundo	
Forster's tern	Sterna forsteri	(A)
Royal tern	Thalasseus maximus	
Sandwich tern	Thalasseus sandvicensis	(A)
Black skimmer	Rynchops niger	(A)

== Tropicbirds ==
Order: Phaethontiformes Family: Phaethontidae

Tropicbirds are slender white birds of tropical oceans, with exceptionally long central tail feathers. Their long wings have black markings, as does the head.

Common name	Species	Status
White-tailed tropicbird	Phaethon lepturus	
Red-billed tropicbird	Phaethon aethereus	

== Shearwaters and petrels ==
Order: Procellariiformes Family: Procellariidae

The Procellariids are the main group of medium-sized "true petrels", characterized by united nostrils with medium septum and a long outer functional primary.

Common name	Species	Status
Cory's shearwater	Calonectris diomedea	(A)

== Storks ==
Order: Ciconiiformes Family: Ciconiidae

Storks are large, heavy, long-legged, long-necked wading birds with long stout bills and wide wingspans. They lack the powder down that other wading birds such as herons, spoonbills, and ibises use to clean off fish slime. Storks lack a pharynx and are mute.

Common name	Species	Status
Wood stork	Mycteria americana	(A)

== Frigatebirds ==
Order: Suliformes Family: Fregatidae

Frigatebirds are large seabirds usually found over tropical oceans. They are large, black or black-and-white, with long wings and deeply forked tails. The males have colored inflatable throat pouches. They do not swim or walk and cannot take off from a flat surface. Having the largest wingspan-to-body-weight ratio of any bird, they are essentially aerial, able to stay aloft for more than a week.

Common name	Species	Status
Magnificent frigatebird	Fregata magnificens	

== Boobies and gannets ==
Order: Suliformes Family: Sulidae

The sulids comprise the gannets and boobies with only boobies occurring in Vieques. Both groups are medium-large coastal seabirds that plunge-dive for fish.

Common name	Species	Status
Masked booby	Sula dactylatra	
Brown booby	Sula leucogaster	

== Cormorants and shags ==
Order: Suliformes Family: Phalacrocoracidae

Phalacrocoracidae is a family of medium to large coastal, fish-eating seabirds that includes cormorants and shags. Plumage coloration is varied with the majority having mainly dark plumage, some species being black-and-white, and a few being quite colorful.

Common name	Species	Status
Double-crested cormorant	Nannopterum auritum	(A)

== Pelicans ==
Order: Pelecaniformes Family: Pelecanidae

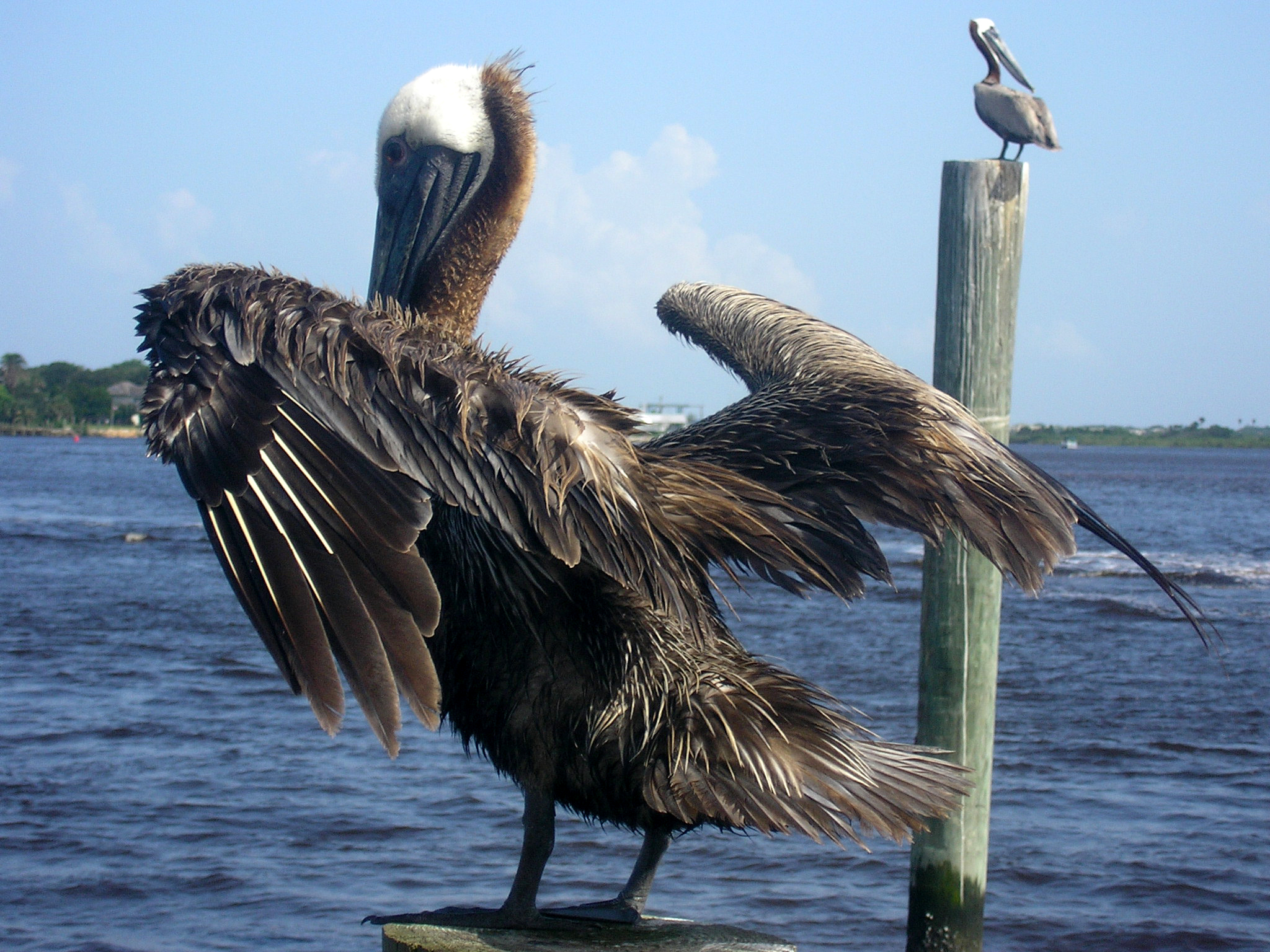
Brown pelican, a protected species which commonly occurs in Vieques's coasts.

Pelicans are very large water birds with a distinctive pouch under their beak Like other birds in the order Pelecaniformes, they have four webbed toes.

Common name	Species	Status
American white pelican	Pelecanus erythrorhynchos	(A)
Brown pelican	Pelecanus occidentalis	

== Bitterns, herons and egrets ==
Order: Pelecaniformes Family: Ardeidae

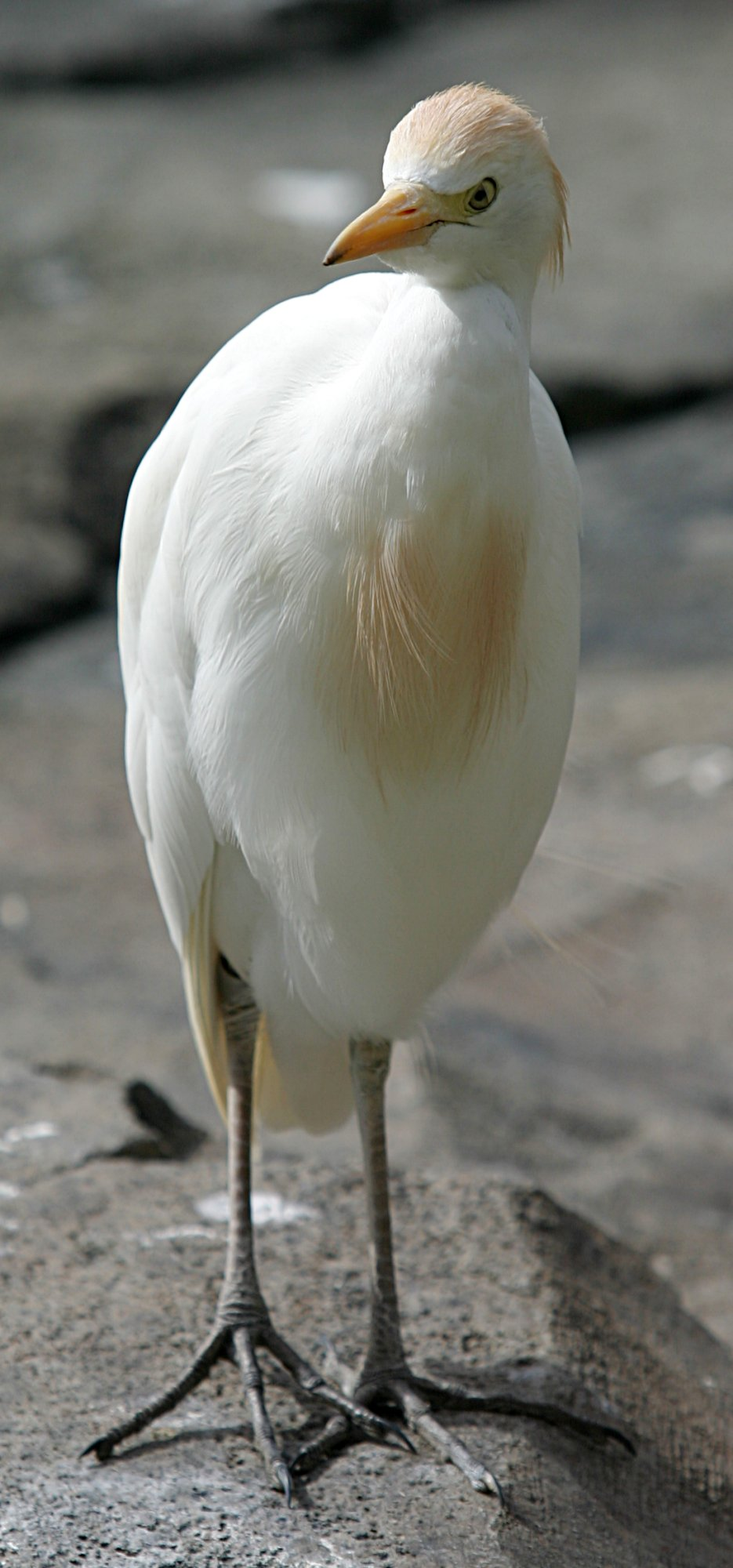
Cattle egret (garza in Spanish), a common bird in Vieques, usually found on top of cows.

The family Ardeidae contains the bitterns, herons and egrets. Herons and egrets are medium to large wading birds with long necks and legs. Bitterns tend to be shorter necked and more secretive. Members of Ardeidae fly with their necks retracted, unlike other long-necked birds such as storks, ibises and spoonbills.

Common name	Species	Status
Least bittern	Ixobrychus exilis	
Great blue heron	Ardea herodias	
Great egret	Egretta alba	
Snowy egret	Egretta thula	
Little blue heron	Egretta caerulea	
Tricolored heron	Egretta tricolor	
Reddish egret	Egretta rufescens	(A)
Cattle egret	Bubulcus ibis	
Green heron	Butorides virescens	
Black-crowned night heron	Nycticorax nycticorax	
Yellow-crowned night heron	Nyctanassa violacea	

== Ibises and spoonbills ==
Order: Pelecaniformes Family: Threskiornithidae

Threskiornithidae is a family of large terrestrial and wading birds which includes the ibises and spoonbills. They have long, broad wings with 11 primary and about 20 secondary feathers. They are strong fliers and, rather surprisingly, given their size and weight, very capable soarers.

Common name	Species	Status
Scarlet ibis	Eudocimus ruber	(A)
Glossy ibis	Plegadis falcinellus	(A)

== New World vultures ==
Order: Cathartiformes Family: Cathartidae

The New World vultures are not closely related to Old World vultures, but superficially resemble them because of convergent evolution. Like the Old World vultures, they are scavengers. However, unlike Old World vultures, which find carcasses by sight, New World vultures have a good sense of smell with which they locate carcasses.

Common name	Species	Status
Turkey vulture	Cathartes aura	(I)

== Osprey ==
Order: Accipitriformes Family: Pandionidae

The family Pandionidae contains only one species, the osprey. The osprey (Pandion haliaetus) is a medium large raptor which is a specialist fish-eater with a worldwide distribution.

Common name	Species	Status
Osprey	Pandion haliaetus	

== Hawks, eagles, and kites ==
Order: Accipitriformes Family: Accipitridae

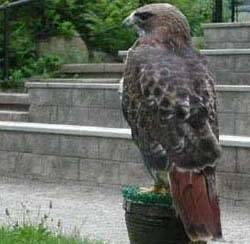
Red-tailed hawk, commonly known as guaraguao in Puerto Rico and Vieques.

Accipitridae is a family of birds of prey, which includes hawks, eagles, kites, harriers and Old World vultures. These birds have very large powerful hooked beaks for tearing flesh from their prey, strong legs, powerful talons and keen eyesight.

Common name	Species	Status
Swallow-tailed kite	Elanoides forficatus	(A)
Northern harrier	Circus hudsonius	(A)
Broad-winged hawk	Buteo platypterus	
Red-tailed hawk	Buteo jamaicensis	

== Owls ==
Order: Strigiformes Family: Strigidae

The typical owls are small to large solitary nocturnal birds of prey. They have large forward-facing eyes and ears, a hawk-like beak and a conspicuous circle of feathers around each eye called a facial disk.

Common name	Species	Status
Short-eared owl	Asio flammeus	

== Kingfishers ==
Order: Coraciiformes Family: Alcedinidae

Kingfishers are medium-sized birds with large heads, long, pointed bills, short legs and stubby tails.

Common name	Species	Status
Belted kingfisher	Megaceryle alcyon	

== Woodpeckers ==
Order: Piciformes Family: Picidae

Woodpeckers are small to medium-sized birds with chisel-like beaks, short legs, stiff tails and long tongues used for capturing insects. Some species have feet with two toes pointing forward and two backward, while several species have only three toes. Many woodpeckers have the habit of tapping noisily on tree trunks with their beaks.

Common name	Species	Status
Yellow-bellied sapsucker	Sphyrapicus varius	(A)
Puerto Rican woodpecker	Melanerpes portoricensis	

== Falcons and caracaras ==
Order: Falconiformes Family: Falconidae

Falconidae is a family of diurnal birds of prey. They differ from hawks, eagles and kites in that they kill with their beaks instead of their talons.

Common name	Species	Status
American kestrel	Falco sparverius	
Merlin	Falco columbarius	(A)
Peregrine falcon	Falco peregrinus	(A)

== New World and African parrots ==
Order: Psittaciformes Family: Psittacidae

Parrots are small to large birds with a characteristic curved beak. Their upper mandibles have slight mobility in the joint with the skull and they have a generally erect stance. All parrots are zygodactyl, having the four toes on each foot placed two at the front and two to the back.

Common name	Species	Status
Monk parakeet	Myiopsitta monachus	(I)
Puerto Rican parrot	Amazona vittata	(Ex)
Brown-throated parakeet	Eupsittula pertinax	(Ex)

== Tyrant flycatchers ==
Order: Passeriformes Family: Tyrannidae

Tyrant flycatchers are Passerine birds which occur throughout North and South America. They superficially resemble the Old World flycatchers, but are more robust and have stronger bills. They do not have the sophisticated vocal capabilities of the songbirds. Most, but not all, are rather plain. As the name implies, most are insectivorous.

Common name	Species	Status
Caribbean elaenia	Elaenia martinica	
Puerto Rican flycatcher	Miarchus antillarum	
Gray kingbird	Tyrannus dominicensis	
Loggerhead kingbird	Tyrannus caudifasciatus	
Scissor-tailed flycatcher	Tyrannus caudifasciatus	(A)
Fork-tailed flycatcher	Tyrannus caudifasciatus	(A)

== Vireos, shrike-babblers, and erpornis ==
Order: Passeriformes Family: Vireonidae

The vireos are a group of small to medium-sized passerine birds. They are typically greenish in color and resemble wood warblers apart from their heavier bills.

Common name	Species	Status
White-eyed vireo	Vireo griseus	(A)
Yellow-throated vireo	Vireo flavifrons	(A)
Red-eyed vireo	Vireo olivaceus	
Black-whiskered vireo	Vireo altiloquus	

== Swallows ==
Order: Passeriformes Family: Hirundinidae

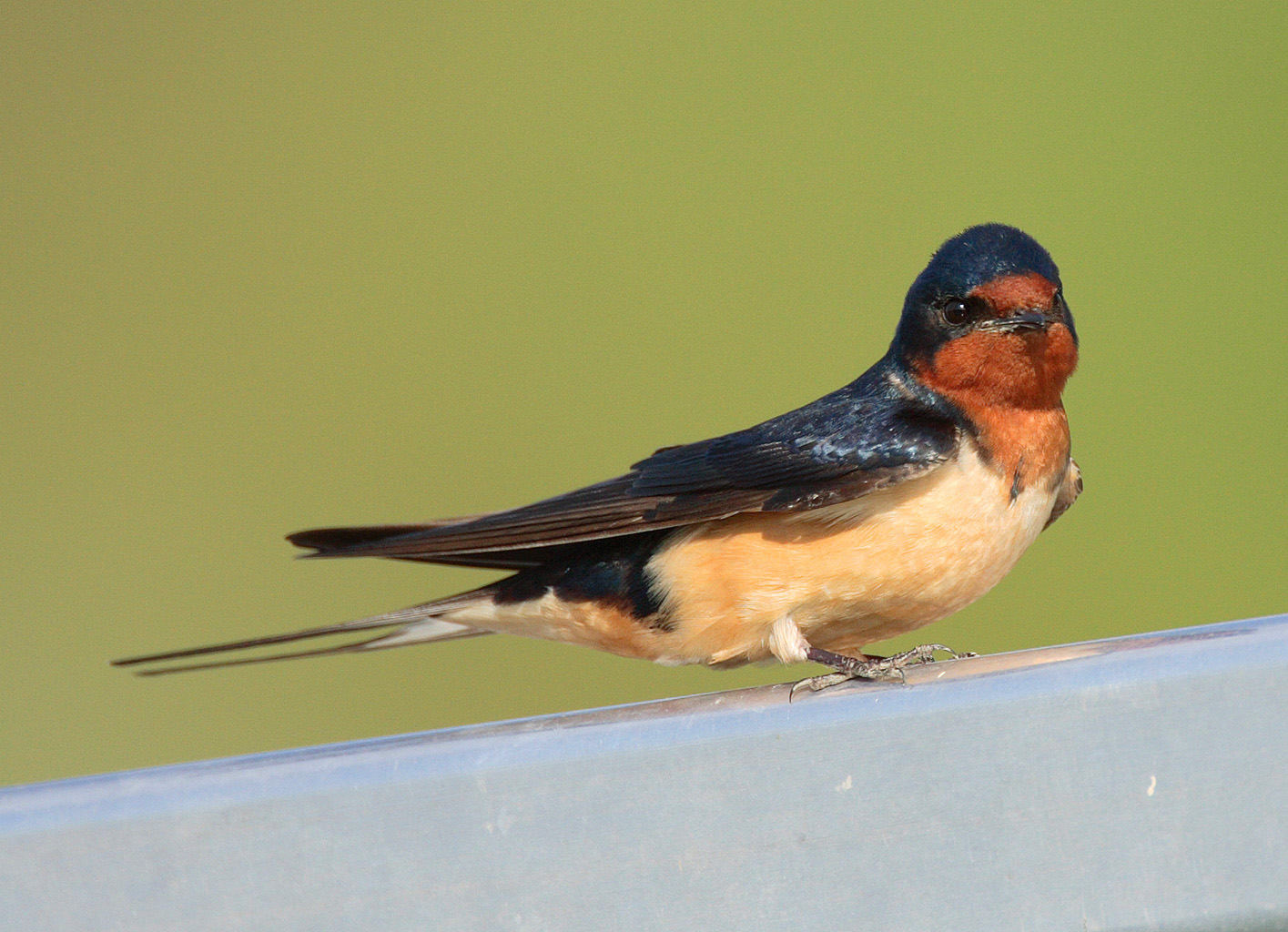
Barn swallow, species from this family are known as golondrinas in Puerto Rico and Vieques.

The family Hirundinidae is adapted to aerial feeding. They have a slender streamlined body, long pointed wings and a short bill with a wide gape. The feet are adapted to perching rather than walking, and the front toes are partially joined at the base.

Common name	Species	Status
Northern rough-winged swallow	Stelgidopteryx serripennis	(A)
Caribbean martin	Progne dominicensis	
Bank swallow	Riparia riparia	(A)
Barn swallow	Hirundo rustica	
Cliff swallow	Petrochelidon pyrrhonota	(A)
Cave swallow	Petrochelidon fulva	

== Starlings ==
Order: Passeriformes Family: Sturnidae

Starlings are small to medium-sized passerine birds. They are medium-sized passerines with strong feet. Their flight is strong and direct and they are very gregarious. Their preferred habitat is fairly open country, and they eat insects and fruit. Plumage is typically dark with a metallic sheen.

Common name	Species	Status
European starling	Sturnus vulgaris	(A)

== Mockingbirds and thrashers ==
Order: Passeriformes Family: Mimidae

The mimids are a family of passerine birds that includes thrashers, mockingbirds, tremblers and the New World catbirds. These birds are notable for their vocalization, especially their remarkable ability to mimic a wide variety of birds and other sounds heard outdoors. The species tend towards dull grays and browns in their appearance.

Common name	Status	
Gray catbird	Dumetella carolinensis	(A)
Pearly-eyed thrasher	Margarops fuscatus	
Northern mockingbird	Mimus polyglottos	

== Thrushes and allies ==
Order: Passeriformes Family: Turdidae

The Thrushes are a group of passerine birds that occur mainly but not exclusively in the Old World. They are plump, soft plumaged, small to medium-sized insectivores or sometimes omnivores, often feeding on the ground. Many have attractive songs.

Common name	Status	
Bicknell's thrush	Catharus bicknelli	(A)
Eastern red-legged thrush	Turdus ardosiaceus	(A)

== Weavers and allies ==
Order: Passeriformes Family: Ploceidae

Weavers are a group of small passerine birds related to the finches. These are seed-eating birds with rounded conical bills, most of which breed in sub-Saharan Africa, with fewer species in tropical Asia. Weavers get their name from the large woven nests many species make. They are gregarious birds which often breed colonially.

Common name	Status	
Northern red bishop	Euplectes franciscanus	(A)

== Waxbills and allies ==
Order: Passeriformes Family: Estrildidae

The estrildid finches are small passerine birds of the Old World tropics and Australasia. They are gregarious and often colonial seed eaters with short thick but pointed bills. They are all similar in structure and habits, but have wide variation in plumage colors and patterns.

Common name	Species	Status
Bronze mannikin	Spermestes cucullata	(I)
Scaly-breasted munia	Lonchura punctulata	(I)

== Whydahs ==
Order: Passeriformes Family: Viduidae

The Viduidae is a family of small passerine birds native to Africa that includes indigobirds and whydahs. All species are brood parasites, which lay their eggs in the nests of estrildid finches. Species usually have black or indigo predominating in their plumage.

Common name	Species	Status
Pin-tailed whydah	Vidua macroura	(I)

== Old World sparrows ==
Order: Passeriformes Family: Passeridae

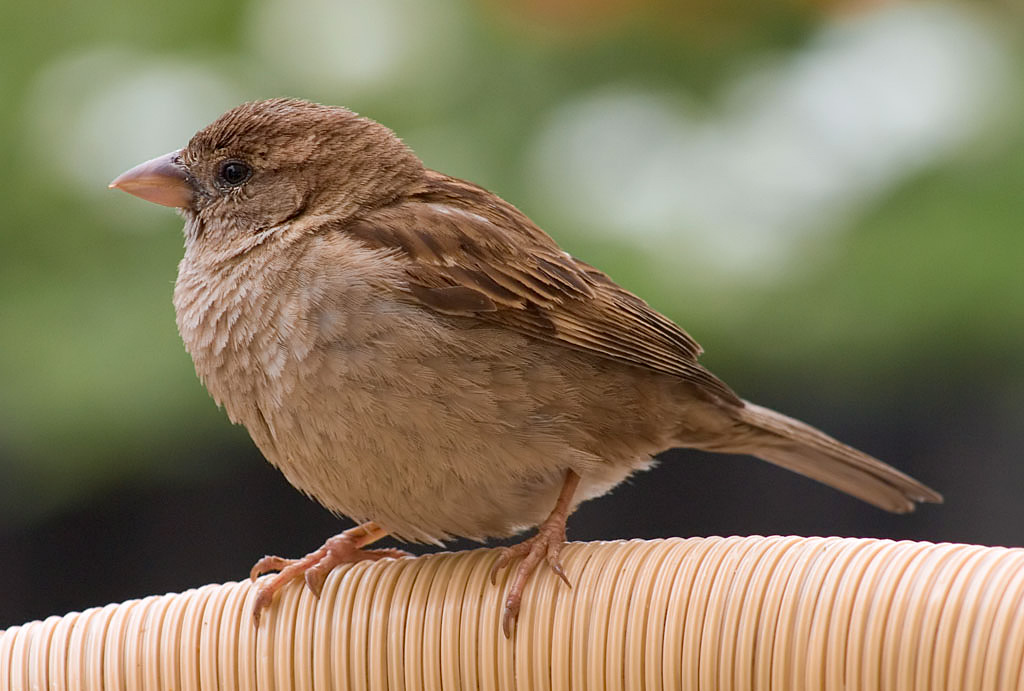
House sparrow, a common occurring species in Vieques's inhabited areas.

Sparrows are small passerine birds. In general, sparrows tend to be small plump brownish or grayish birds with short tails and short powerful beaks. Sparrows are seed eaters, but they also consume small insects.

Common name	Species	Status
House sparrow	Passer domesticus	(I)

== Finches, euphonias, and allies ==
Order: Passeriformes Family: Fringillidae

Finches are seed-eating passerine birds, that are small to moderately large and have a strong beak, usually conical and in some species very large. All have twelve tail feathers and nine primaries. These birds have a bouncing flight with alternating bouts of flapping and gliding on closed wings, and most sing well.

Common name	Species	Status
Puerto Rican euphonia	Chlorophonia sclateri	(Ex)

== New World sparrows ==
Order: Passeriformes Family: Passerellidae

New World sparrows are seed-eating birds with distinctively shaped bills. Most of the species in this family are known as sparrows, but these birds are not closely related to the Old World sparrows which are in the family Passeridae. Many species have distinctive head patterns.

Common name	Species	Status
Grasshopper sparrow	Ammodramus savannarum	

== Spindalises ==
Order: Passeriformes Family: Spindalidae

The members of this small family are native to the Greater Antilles. They were formerly classified as tanagers but were placed in their own family in 2017.

Common name	Species	Status
Puerto Rican spindalis	Spindalis portoricensis	(A)

== Troupials and allies ==
Order: Passeriformes Family: Icteridae

The icterids are a group of small to medium-sized, often colorful passerine birds restricted to the New World and include the grackles, New World blackbirds and New World orioles. Most species have black as a predominant plumage color, often enlivened by yellow, orange or red.

Common name	Species	Status
Bobolink	Dolichonyx oryzivorus	(A)
Baltimore oriole	Icterus galbula	(A)
Yellow-shouldered blackbird	Agelaius xanthomus	(A)
Shiny cowbird	Molothrus bonariensis	
Brown-headed cowbird	Molothrus ater	(A)
Greater Antillean grackle	Quiscalus niger	

== New World warblers ==
Order: Passeriformes Family: Parulidae

The New World warblers are a group of small often colorful passerine birds restricted to the New World. Most are arboreal, but some are more terrestrial. Most members of this family are insectivores.

Common name	Species	Status
Ovenbird	Seiurus aurocapilla	
Worm-eating warbler	Helmitheros vermivorum	(A)
Louisiana waterthrush	Parkesia motacilla	(A)
Northern waterthrush	Parkesia novaboracensis	
Black-and-white warbler	Mniotilta varia	
Prothonotary warbler	Protonotaria citrea	(A)
Tennessee warbler	Leiothlypis peregrina	(A)
Connecticut warbler	Oporornis agilis	(A)
Mourning warbler	Geothlypis philadelphia	(A)
Kentucky warbler	Geothlypis formosa	(A)
Common yellowthroat	Geothlypis trichas	
Hooded warbler	Setophaga citrina	(A)
American redstart	Setophaga ruticilla	
Cape May warbler	Setophaga tigrina	
Northern parula	Setophaga americana	
Magnolia warbler	Setophaga magnolia	(A)
Blackburnian warbler	Setophaga fusca	(A)
Yellow warbler	Setophaga petechia	
Blackpoll warbler	Setophaga striata	
Black-throated blue warbler	Setophaga caerulescens	(A)
Palm warbler	Setophaga palmarum	(A)
Pine warbler	Setophaga pinus	(A)
Yellow-rumped warbler	Setophaga coronata	(A)
Yellow-throated warbler	Setophaga dominica	(A)
Prairie warbler	Setophaga discolor	
Adelaide's warbler	Setophaga adelaidae	
Black-throated green warbler	Setophaga virens	(A)
Canada warbler	Cardellina canadensis	(A)

== Cardinals and allies ==
Order: Passeriformes Family: Cardinalidae

The cardinals are a family of robust, seed-eating birds with strong bills. They are typically associated with open woodland. The sexes usually have distinct plumages.

Common name	Species	Status
Scarlet tanager	Piranga olivacea	(A)
Rose-breasted grosbeak	Pheucticus ludovicianus	(A)
Indigo bunting	Passerina cyanea	(A)

== Tanagers and allies ==
Order: Passeriformes Family: Thraupidae

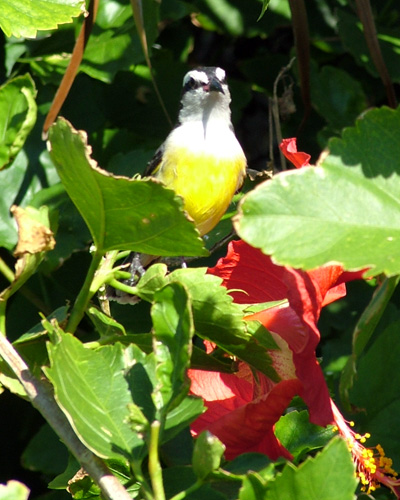
Bananaquit, commonly known as reinita, one of the most abundant species in Vieques.

The bananaquit is a small passerine bird. It has a slender, curved bill, adapted to taking nectar from flowers. It is the only member of the genus Coereba (Vieillot, 1809) and is normally placed within the family Thraupidae.

Common name	Species	Status
Bananaquit	Coereba flaveola	
Yellow-faced grassquit	Tiaris olivaceus	
Lesser Antillean bullfinch	Loxigilla noctis	(A)
Black-faced grassquit	Melanospiza bicolor	

== See also ==
- List of birds
- Lists of birds by region
- List of endemic fauna of Puerto Rico
- List of birds of Puerto Rico
