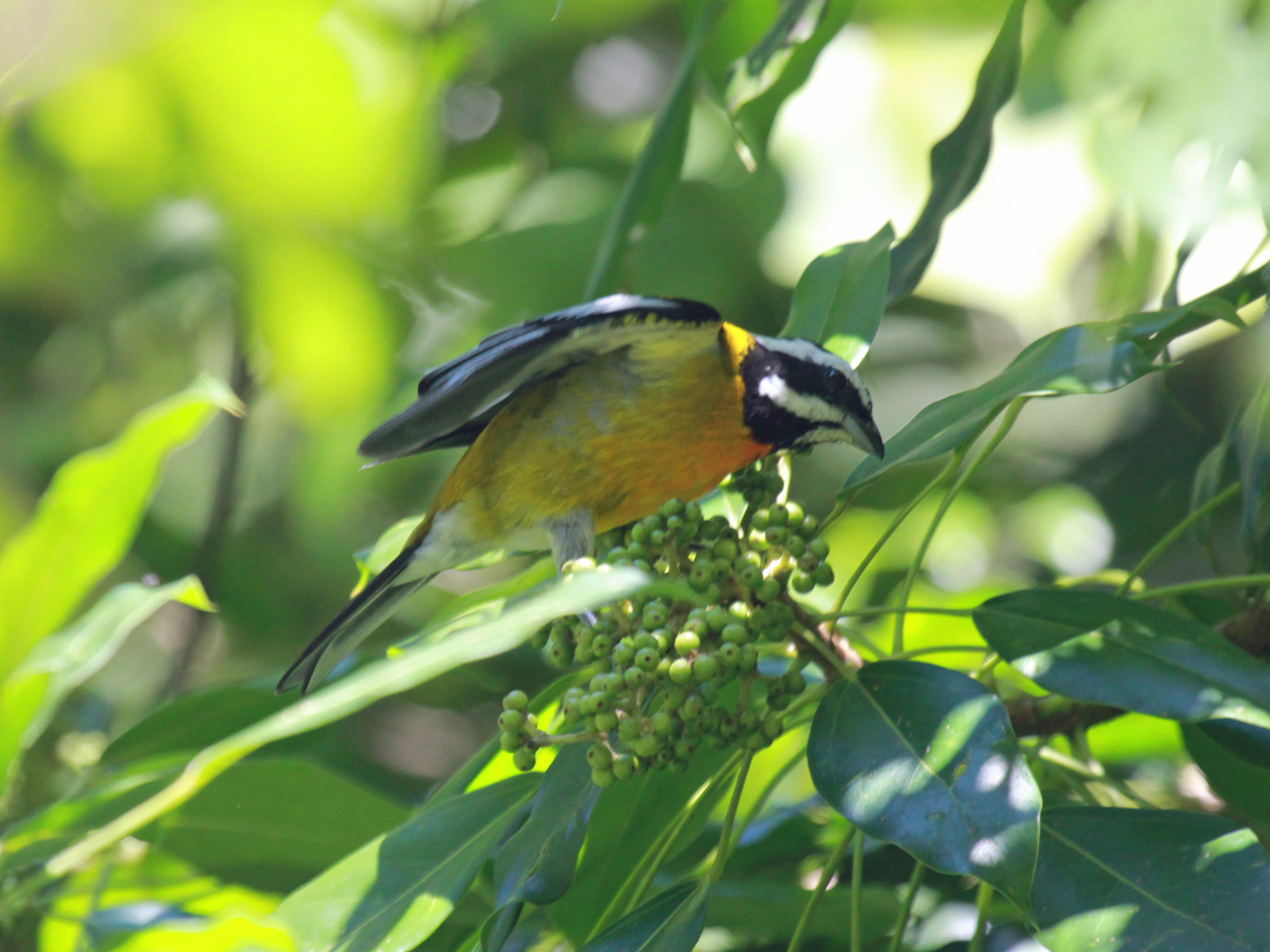
- Male

Conservation status
- Least Concern (IUCN 3.1)

Scientific classification
- Kingdom: Animalia
- Phylum: Chordata
- Class: Aves
- Order: Passeriformes
- Family: Spindalidae
- Genus: Spindalis
- Species: S. nigricephala

Binomial name
- Spindalis nigricephala (Jameson, 1835)

= Jamaican spindalis =

Species of bird

The Jamaican spindalis (Spindalis nigricephala) is one of four species of bird in family Spindalidae. It is endemic to Jamaica.

== Taxonomy and systematics ==
Historically, the genus Spindalis consisted of a single polytypic species, Spindalis zena (with the common name of stripe-headed tanager), with eight recognized subspecies. The genus was in the "true" tanager family Thraupidae. Beginning in 1997, based primarily on morphological and vocalization differences, three of the subspecies were elevated to species status of which the Jamaican spindalis is one, and S. zena was renamed western spindalis. Beginning in 2017, taxonomic systems moved the four spindalis species to the newly created family Spindalidae, which is not closely related to the tanagers.

The Jamaican spindalis is monotypic.

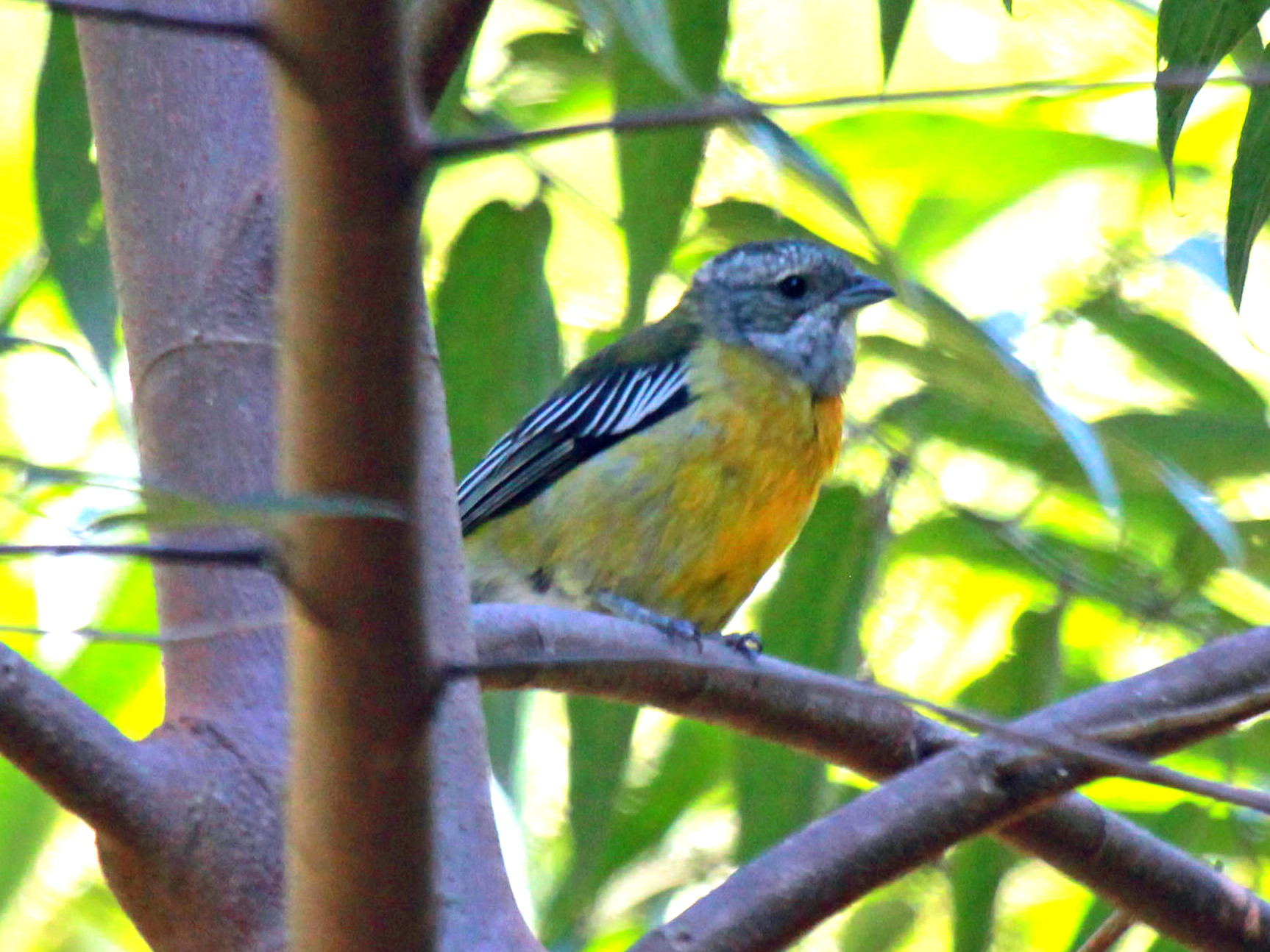
Female

== Description ==
The Jamaican spindalis is about 18 cm (7.1 in) long and weighs 38 to 65 g (1.3 to 2.3 oz). Adult males have a black head with a wide white supercilium and "moustache". It has a white chin and upper throat. Its back is yellowish olive, its rump tawny yellow, and its uppertail coverts black. Its tail is black with wide white edges to the feathers. Its wings are black with white edges on most feathers. Its chest is bright yellowish orange becoming yellow on the breast. Its belly and undertail coverts are white. Adult females have grayish olive head, throat, and upperparts. Its chest is pale orange-yellow, the belly pale yellow, and the undertail coverts whitish. Juveniles resemble adult females but are duller.

== Distribution and habitat ==
The Jamaican spindalis is found throughout Jamaica though it is more numerous in the uplands and local on the north and southwest coasts. It inhabits forest, woodlands, and brushy areas where there are fruiting trees and shrubs.

== Behavior ==
=== Movement ===
The Jamaican spindalis is a year-round resident throughout its range but makes local movements depending on the availability of fruit.

=== Feeding ===
The Jamaican spindalis' principle diet is fruits and berries of a wide variety of trees and shrubs, both native and introduced. It also eats small amounts of leaves and blossoms. It feeds mostly in pairs or family groups but may gather in groups of about 10 at a heavily fruited tree. It feeds acrobatically, hanging from twigs to eat berries.

=== Breeding ===
The Jamaican spindalis' breeding season spans from April to July. It makes a loose cup nest from grass and rootlets and lays a clutch of two or three eggs. Nothing else is known about the species' breeding biology.

=== Vocalization ===
As of late 2022 xeno-canto had only one recording of a Jamaican spindalis vocalization and the Cornell Lab of Ornithology's Macaulay Library only two. The species is generally quiet. It does have a whisper song "chu wheet, chee see whee see, chu wheet", and when foraging in groups makes "a high, fast 'chi-chi-chi-chi-chi'."

== Status ==
The IUCN has assessed the Jamaican spindalis as being of Least Concern. Although it has a small range and an unknown population size, the latter is believed to be stable. No immediate threats have been identified. It is widespread and common. "Utilization of a variety of habitats, including second growth and brushy areas, safeguards this species against near-term threats".
