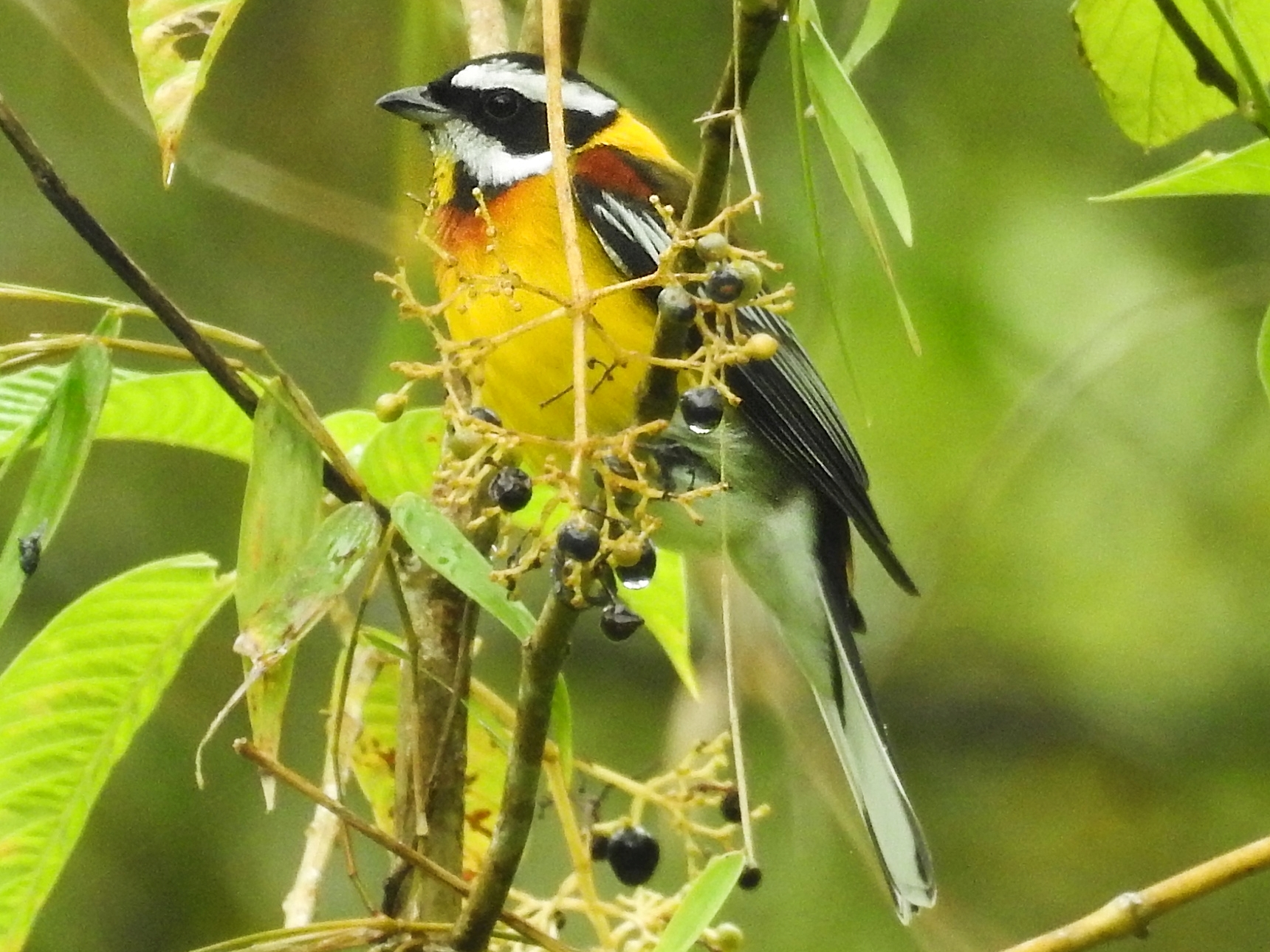

Conservation status
- Least Concern (IUCN 3.1)

Scientific classification
- Kingdom: Animalia
- Phylum: Chordata
- Class: Aves
- Order: Passeriformes
- Family: Spindalidae
- Genus: Spindalis
- Species: S. dominicensis

Binomial name
- Spindalis dominicensis (Bryant, H, 1867)

= Hispaniolan spindalis =

Species of bird endemic to Hispaniola

The Hispaniolan spindalis (Spindalis dominicensis) is one of four species of bird in family Spindalidae. It is endemic to the Caribbean island of Hispaniola which is shared by Haiti and the Dominican Republic.

== Taxonomy and systematics ==
Historically, the genus Spindalis consisted of a single polytypic species, Spindalis zena (with the common name of stripe-headed tanager), with eight recognized subspecies. The genus was in the "true" tanager family Thraupidae. Beginning in 1997, based primarily on morphological and vocalization differences, three of the subspecies were elevated to species status (including the Hispaniolan spindalis), and S. zena was renamed the western spindalis. Beginning in 2017, taxonomic systems moved the four spindalis species to the newly created family Spindalidae, which is not closely related to the tanagers.

The Hispaniolan spindalis is monotypic.

== Description ==
The Hispaniolan spindalis is about 16 cm (6.3 in) long and weighs 25 to 33 g (0.88 to 1.2 oz). Adult males have a black head with a wide white supercilium and "moustache". It has a white chin and a bright yellow patch with black sides in the middle of the throat. Its nape is rich yellow, its back greenish to yellowish olive, its rump tawny yellow, and its uppertail coverts chestnut. Its tail is black, with narrow white edges to the feathers. Its flight feathers are black with white edges, and the wing coverts chestnut, olive, and black. Its chest is deep chestnut, lightening to yellower chestnut on the sides and rich yellow on the breast. Its belly is white and the undertail coverts black. Adult females are generally grayish olive, with a grayer head, yellowish olive rump, dusky brown tail, and whitish underparts with dusky streaks. Juveniles resemble adult females, but are duller.

== Distribution and habitat ==
The Hispaniolan spindalis is found throughout the main island of Hispaniola and on Gonâve Island in Haiti's Gulf of Gonâve. It inhabits a variety of humid forest habitats containing thickets and other low vegetation. It also occurs in orchards and plantations. It is found at almost any elevation but is most numerous in the highlands.

== Behavior ==
=== Movement ===
The Hispaniolan spindalis is a year-round resident throughout its range, but makes local movements depending on the availability of fruit.

=== Feeding ===
The Hispaniolan spindalis feeds primarily on fruit of many varieties that it pecks open. It also feeds on flower buds, seeds, tender leaves, and insects. It forages from near the ground in bushes to the tops of fruiting trees. Though it typically forages in pairs or small groups, larger numbers may gather in a heavily fruited tree.

=== Breeding ===
The Hispaniolan spindalis' breeding season is mostly May to June, though some pairs may raise a second brood after. It makes a small cup nest of dry grass in a tree or bush up to about 4.5 m (10 ft) above the ground. The clutch size is three eggs. Nothing else is known about the species' breeding biology.

=== Vocalization ===
As of late 2022 xeno-canto had only two recordings of Hispaniolan spindalis vocalizations, and the Cornell Lab of Ornithology's Macaulay Library a few more. The male's dawn song is "a thin, high-pitched whistle, or a prolonged weak, sibilant 'tsee see see see'", sung from an exposed perch or inside dense foliage. Females sing a softer version of the male's song. The species' calls include "a high 'thseep'" and a "more drawn-out 'seeee'".

== Status ==
The IUCN has assessed the Hispaniolan spindalis as being of Least Concern. It has a large range, and though its population size is unknown it is believed to be stable. No immediate threats have been identified. It is considered common. "Utilization of a variety of habitats, including second growth and brushy areas, buffers this species against near-term threats, despite its small world range."
