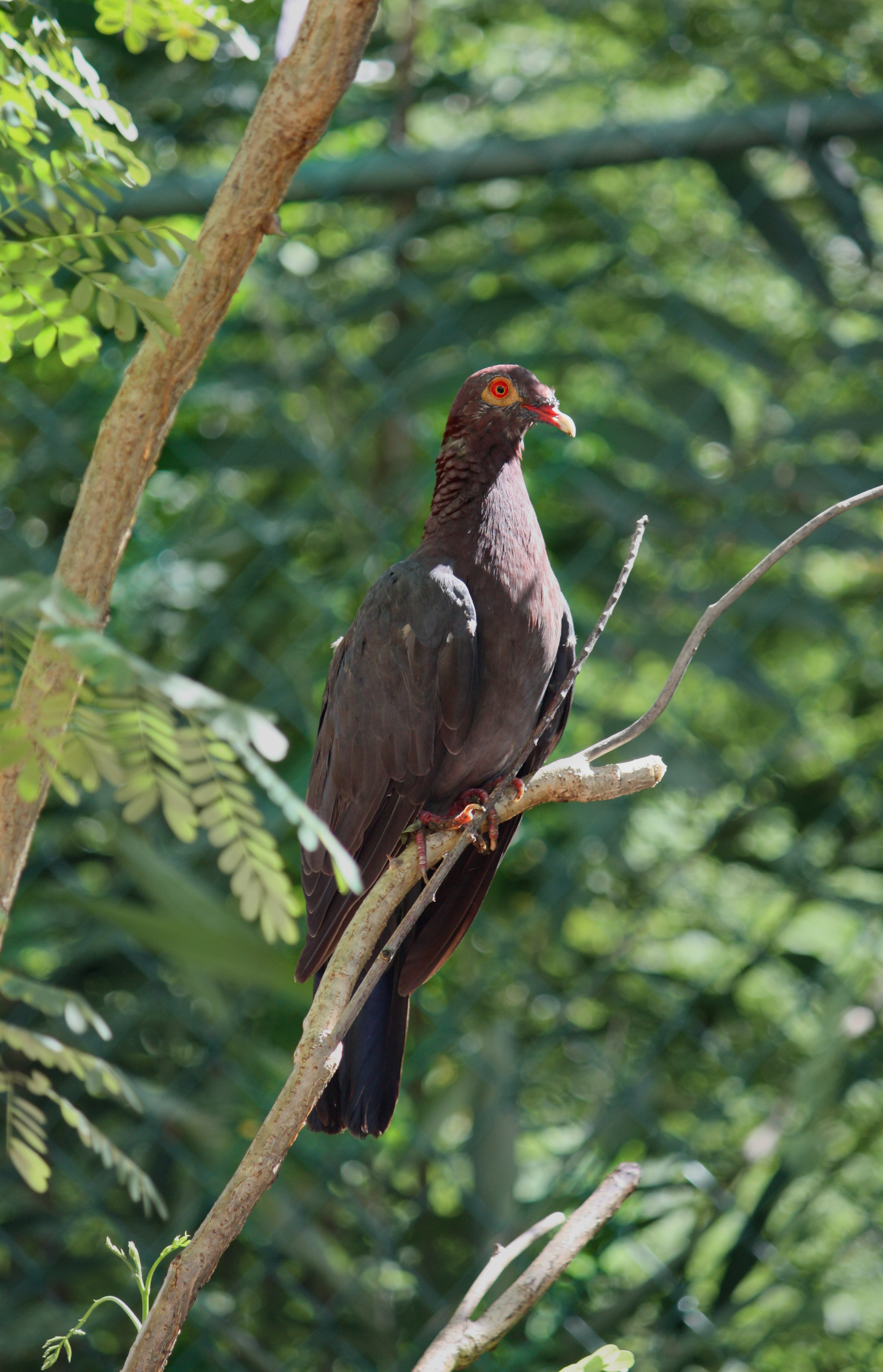
- A Scaly-naped pigeon in Christ Church, Barbados.

Conservation status
- Least Concern (IUCN 3.1)

Scientific classification
- Kingdom: Animalia
- Phylum: Chordata
- Class: Aves
- Order: Columbiformes
- Family: Columbidae
- Genus: Patagioenas
- Species: P. squamosa

Binomial name
- Patagioenas squamosa (Bonnaterre, 1792)

Synonyms
- Columba squamosa

= Scaly-naped pigeon =

Species of bird

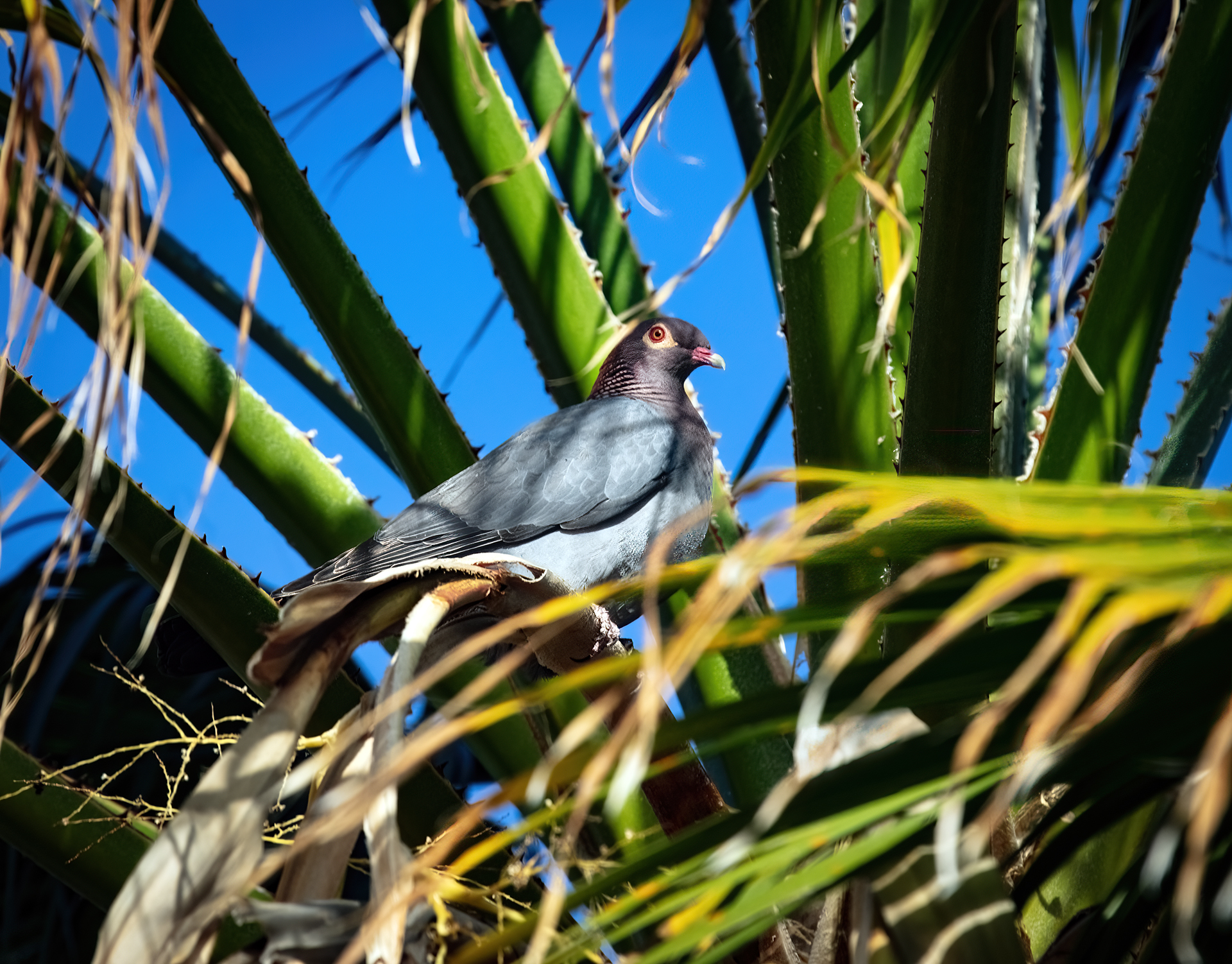
A scaly-naped pigeon in Westpunt, Curacao. February 2026

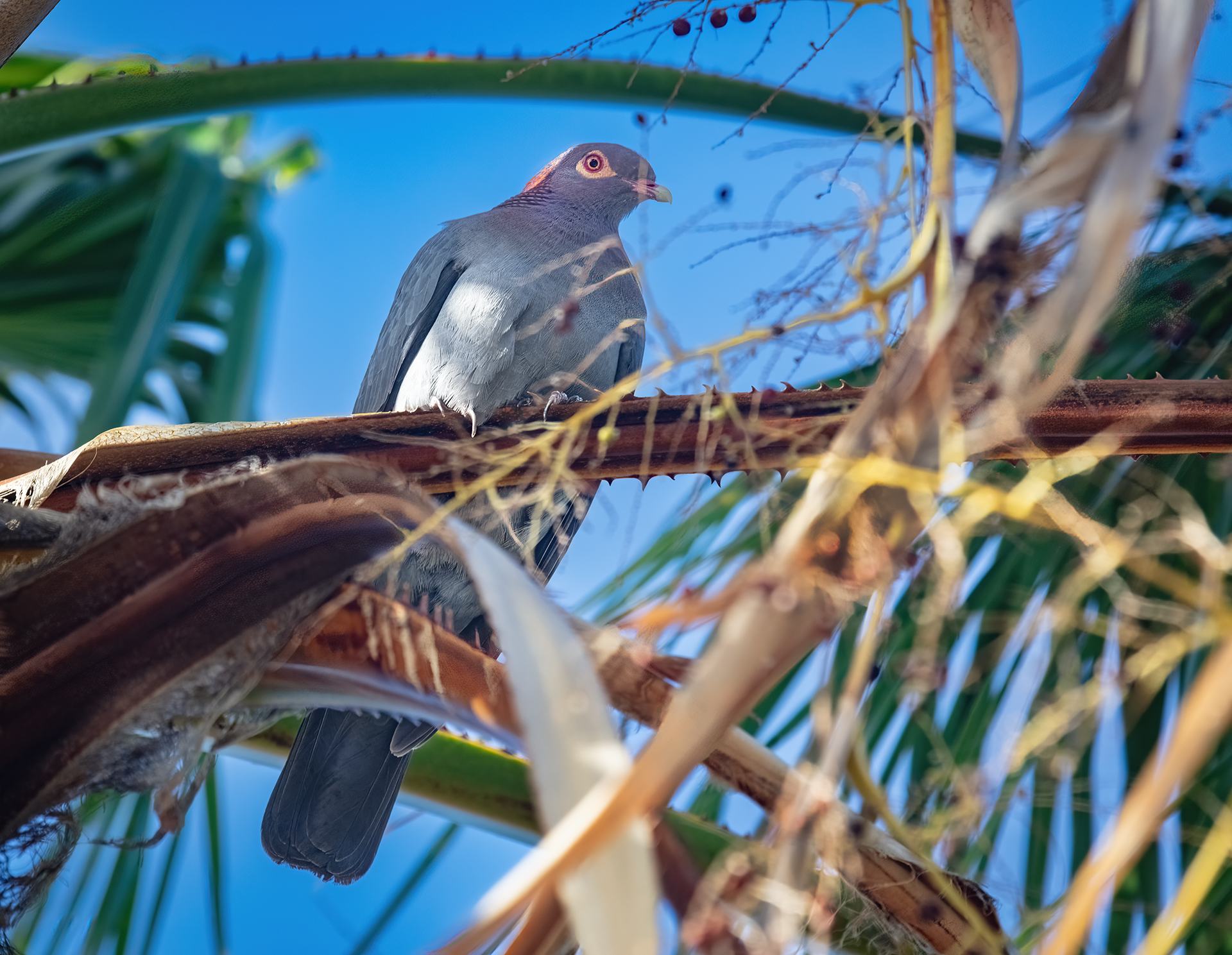
A Scaly-naped pigeon in Westpunt, Curacao. February 2026

The scaly-naped pigeon (Patagioenas squamosa), also known as the red-necked pigeon, is a bird belonging to the family Columbidae. The species occurs throughout the Caribbean.

== Description ==
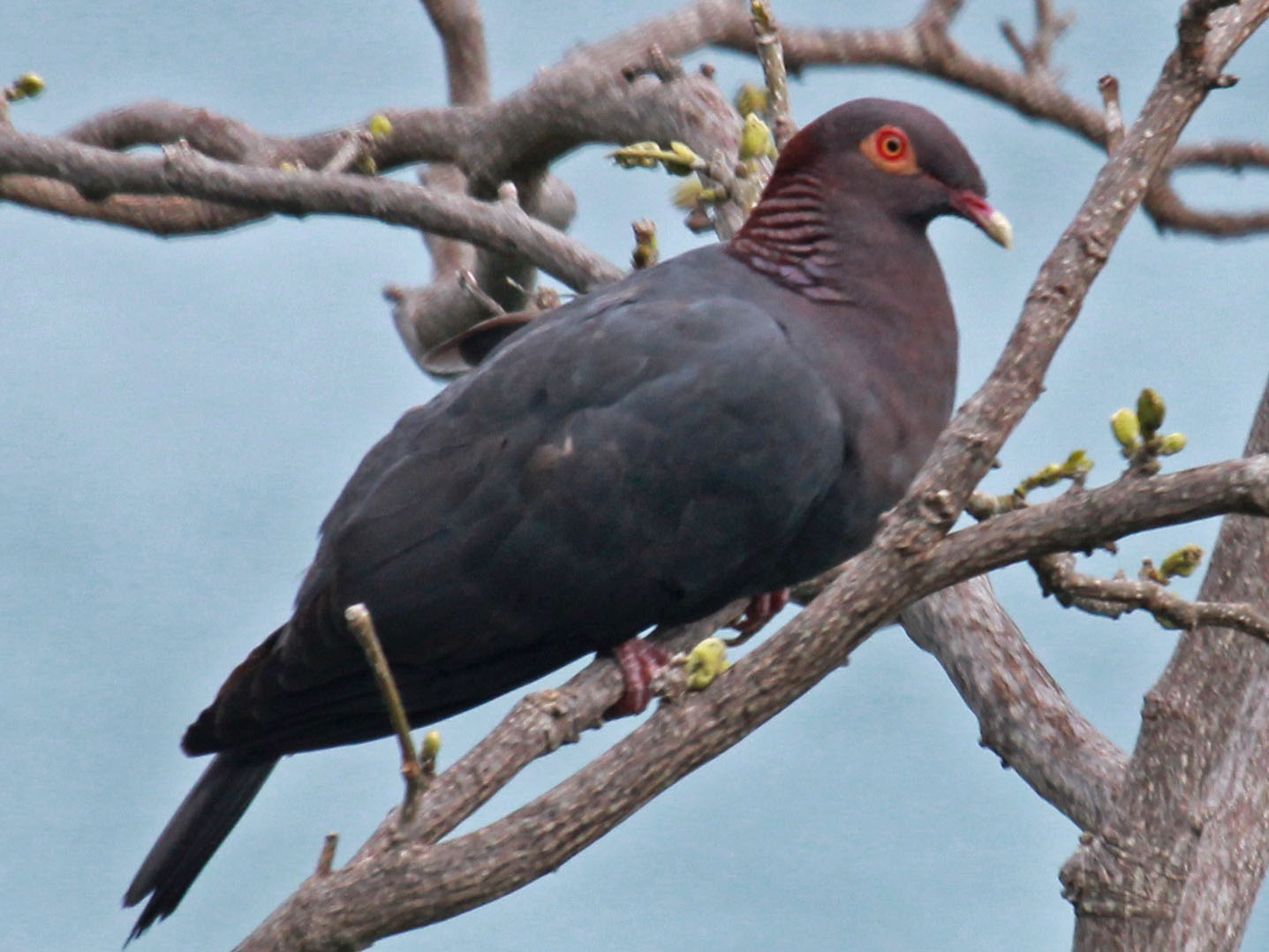
A Scaly-naped pigeon in Puerto Rico

The scaly-naped pigeon is a large slate grey pigeon (14–16 in), with maroon coloured plumage around the neck. The plumage on the species' nape appears scaly, explaining both the common and scientific names of the species. There is a bare patch of skin which surrounds the birds red eyes; this patch tends to be reddish in males and more yellow in females. The legs and the base of the bill of the species are red, while the remainder of the bill is light coloured.

== Distribution and habitat ==
The range of the scaly-naped pigeon includes both the Greater Antilles (except for Jamaica and the Bahamas) and the Lesser Antilles. The species tends to occur in rainforests, however they may also be found in drier lowland woodlands; the species is locally common near human settlements. The biodiversity of the species is threatened due to hunting in regions of the Caribbean, especially considering their high abundance in Puerto Rico. This species has also declined due to hurricanes, affecting the vegetation and environment of their surroundings, leading to a decline in population.

== Behaviour ==
Scaly-naped pigeons are usually found alone or in small groups. They feed in trees and on the ground and often mix with the Rock dove, Eared dove and the Zenaida dove. Like most doves they are wary and will flee if they feel in danger.

=== Reproduction ===
The scaly-naped pigeon lays one to two eggs in a nest constructed mostly in trees.

=== Diet ===
The species feeds primarily on the fruits and seeds of trees.

== See also ==
- Fauna of Puerto Rico
- List of Puerto Rican birds
- List of Vieques birds
