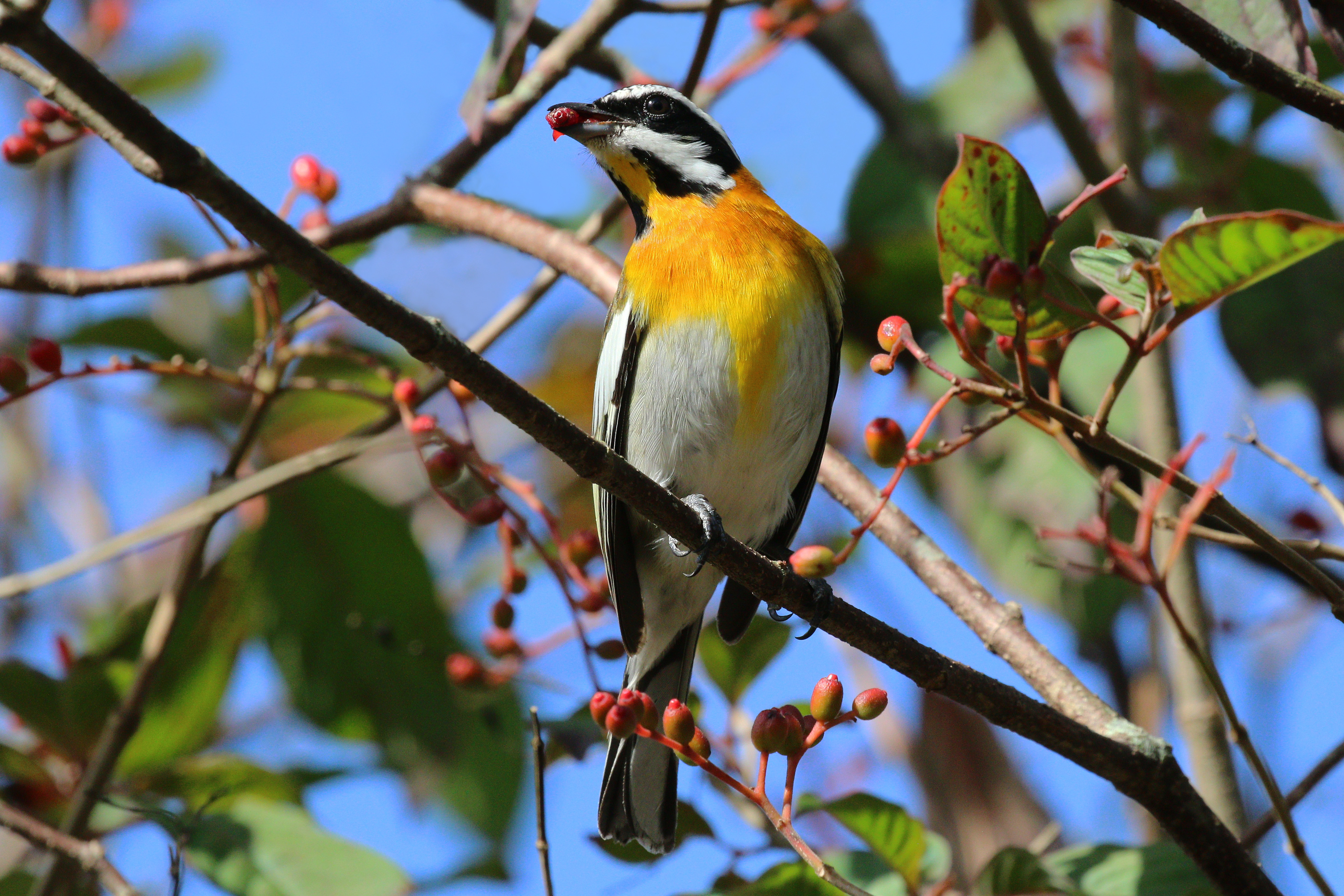
- Western spindalis (Spindalis zena)

Scientific classification
- Kingdom: Animalia
- Phylum: Chordata
- Class: Aves
- Order: Passeriformes
- Family: Phaenicophilidae
- Subfamily: Spindalinae
- Genus: Spindalis; Jardine & Selby, 1837

Type species
- Spindalis bilineatus Jardine & Selby, 1837 (= Tanagra nigricephala Jameson, 1835)

= Spindalis =

Genus of birds

Spindalis is a genus consisting of four non-migratory species of bird in the family Phaenicophilidae. The species are mostly endemic to the West Indies; exceptions include populations of western spindalises on Cozumel Island, off the Yucatán Peninsula's east coast, and in extreme southeastern Florida. The species were traditionally considered aberrant members of the tanager family Thraupidae.

Males are characterized by bright plumage while females are duller and have a different coloration. The nests are cup-shaped.

== Taxonomy ==
The genus Spindalis was introduced in 1837 by the naturalists William Jardine and Prideaux John Selby to accommodate a single species, Spindalis bilineatus Jardine & Selby, 1837. As the only originally included nominal species, S. bilineatus is the type species by monotypy. It is now considered a junior synonym of Tanagra nigricephala Jameson, 1835 (currently Spindalis nigricephala), the Jamaican spindalis.

Spindalises were formerly classified in the family Thraupidae, but molecular studies showed that they were not closely related to other members of that family. Consequently, the family Spindalidae was described for the genus Spindalis in 2013. Oliveros et al. (2019) subsequently provided strong support for a monophyletic group comprising Phaenicophilidae, Nesospingidae (the Puerto Rican Tanager) and Spindalidae. In 2025, the American Ornithological Society merged the latter two families into an expanded Phaenicophilidae. This classification was also adopted by AviList in 2026.

The genus contains four species:

Genus Spindalis – Jardine & Selby, 1837 – four species
| Common name | Scientific name and subspecies | Range | Size and ecology | IUCN status and estimated population |
|---|---|---|---|---|
| Hispaniolan spindalis | Spindalis dominicensis (Bryant, H, 1867) | Hispaniola (Haiti and the Dominican Republic) | Size: Habitat: Diet: | LC |
| Jamaican spindalis Male Female | Spindalis nigricephala (Jameson, 1835) | Jamaica | Size: Habitat: Diet: | LC |
| Puerto Rican spindalis Male Female | Spindalis portoricensis (Bryant, H, 1866) | Puerto Rico | Size: Habitat: Diet: | LC |
| Western spindalis Male Female | Spindalis zena (Linnaeus, 1758) Five subspecies: S. z. zena; S. z. townsendi; S. z. pretrei; S. z. salvini; S. z. benedicti | southeastern Florida and the western Caribbean (Cozumel, the Cayman Islands, Cuba, the Bahamas and the Turks and Caicos Islands) | Size: Habitat: Diet: | LC |

== Taxonomy ==
Historically, the genus consisted of a single polytypic species, Spindalis zena (with the common name of stripe-headed tanager), with eight recognized subspecies—S. z. townsendi and S. z. zena from the Bahamas, S. z. pretrei from Cuba, S. z. salvini from Grand Cayman, S. z. dominicensis from Hispaniola and Gonâve Island, S. z. portoricensis from Puerto Rico, S. z. nigreciphala from Jamaica, and S. z. benedicti from Cozumel Island. In 1997, based primarily on morphological and vocalization differences, three of the subspecies (portoricensis, dominicensis and nigricephala) were elevated to species status. S. zena remained a polytypic species with five recognized subspecies—S. z. pretrei, S. z. salvini, S. z. benedicti, S. z. townsendi, and S. z. zena.

== Sources ==
- Garrido, O.H.; Parkes, K.C.; Reynard, G.B.; Kirkconnell, A.; Sutton, R. (1997). "Taxonomy of the stripe-headed tanager, genus Spindalis (Aves:Thraupidae) of the West Indies". The Wilson Bulletin. 109 (4): 561–594.
