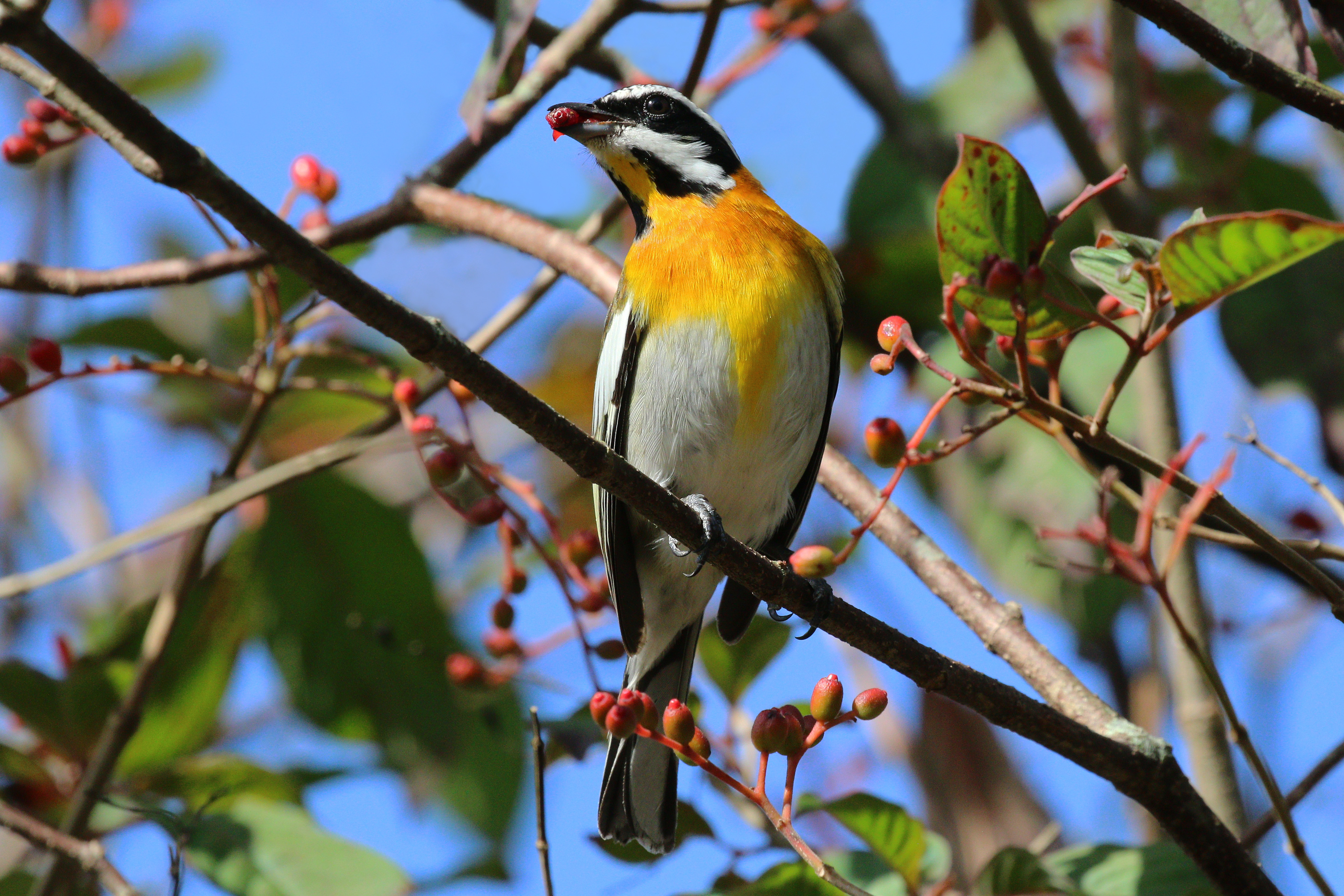
- Male Spindalis zena pretrei Viñales, Cuba
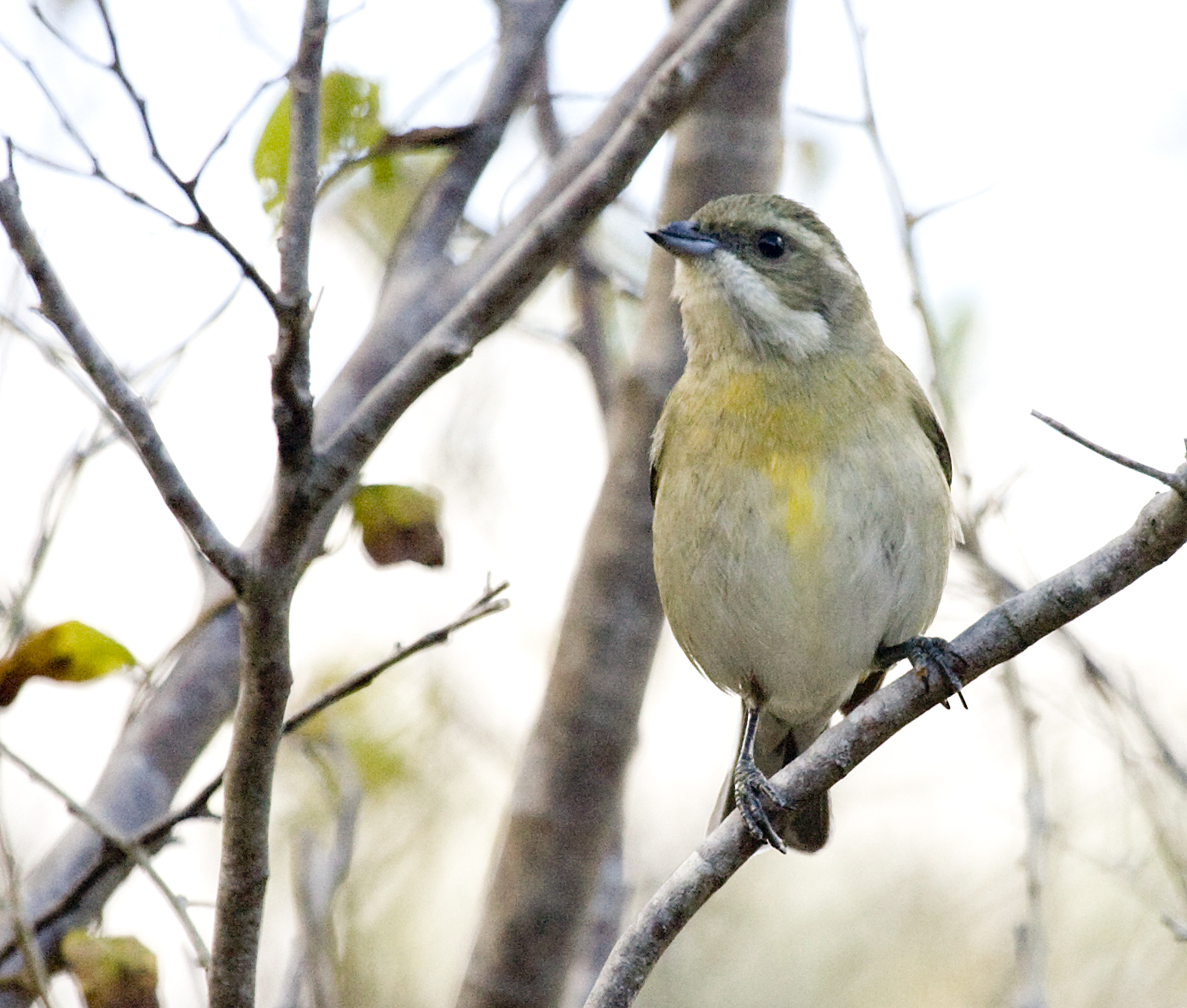
- Female Spindalis zena pretrei Ciego de Ávila, Cuba

Conservation status
- Least Concern (IUCN 3.1)

Scientific classification
- Kingdom: Animalia
- Phylum: Chordata
- Class: Aves
- Order: Passeriformes
- Family: Phaenicophilidae
- Genus: Spindalis
- Species: S. zena

Binomial name
- Spindalis zena (Linnaeus, 1758)

Synonyms
- Fringilla zena Linnaeus, 1758

= Western spindalis =

Species of bird

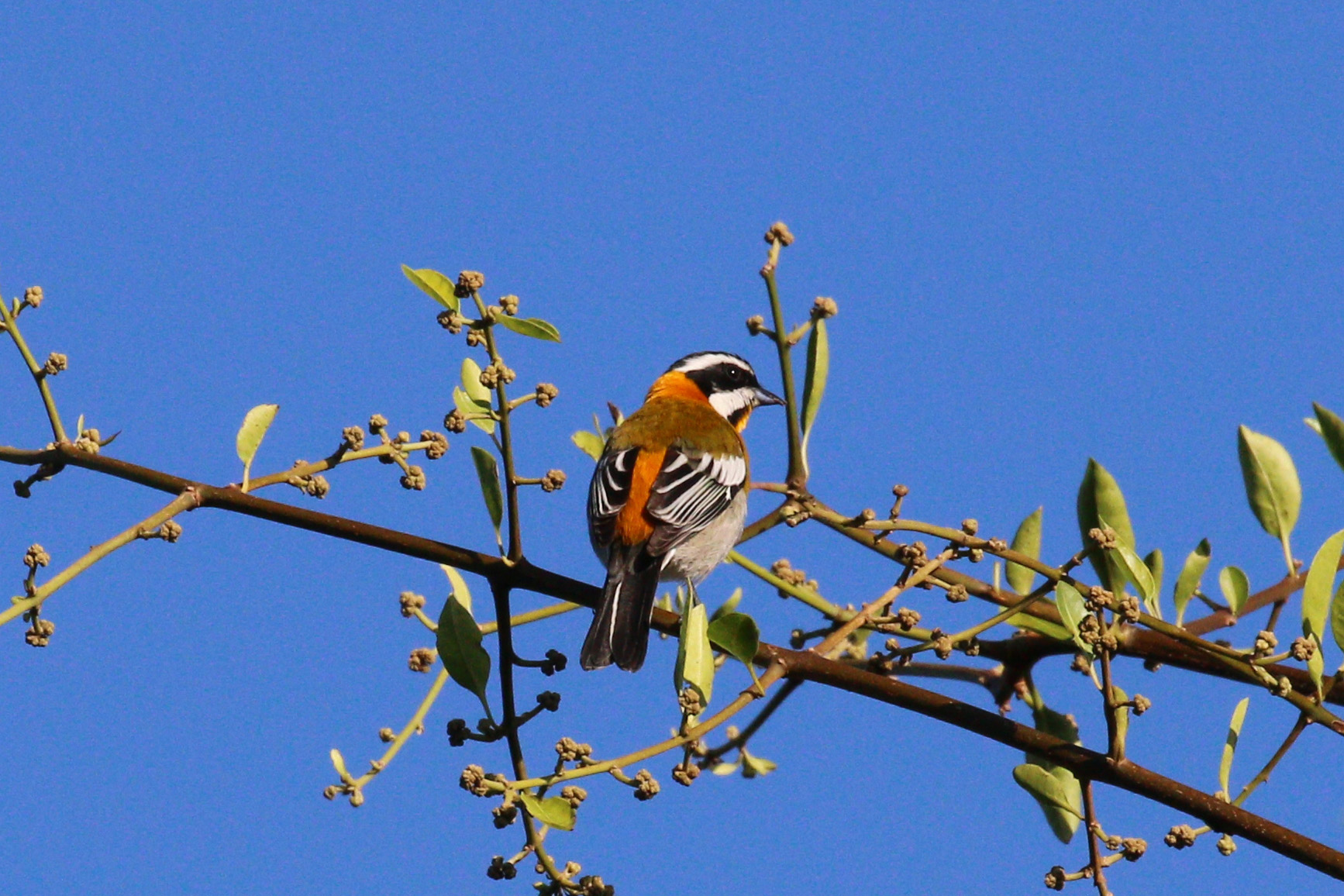
Male Spindalis zena pretrei showing feathers on back, Cuba

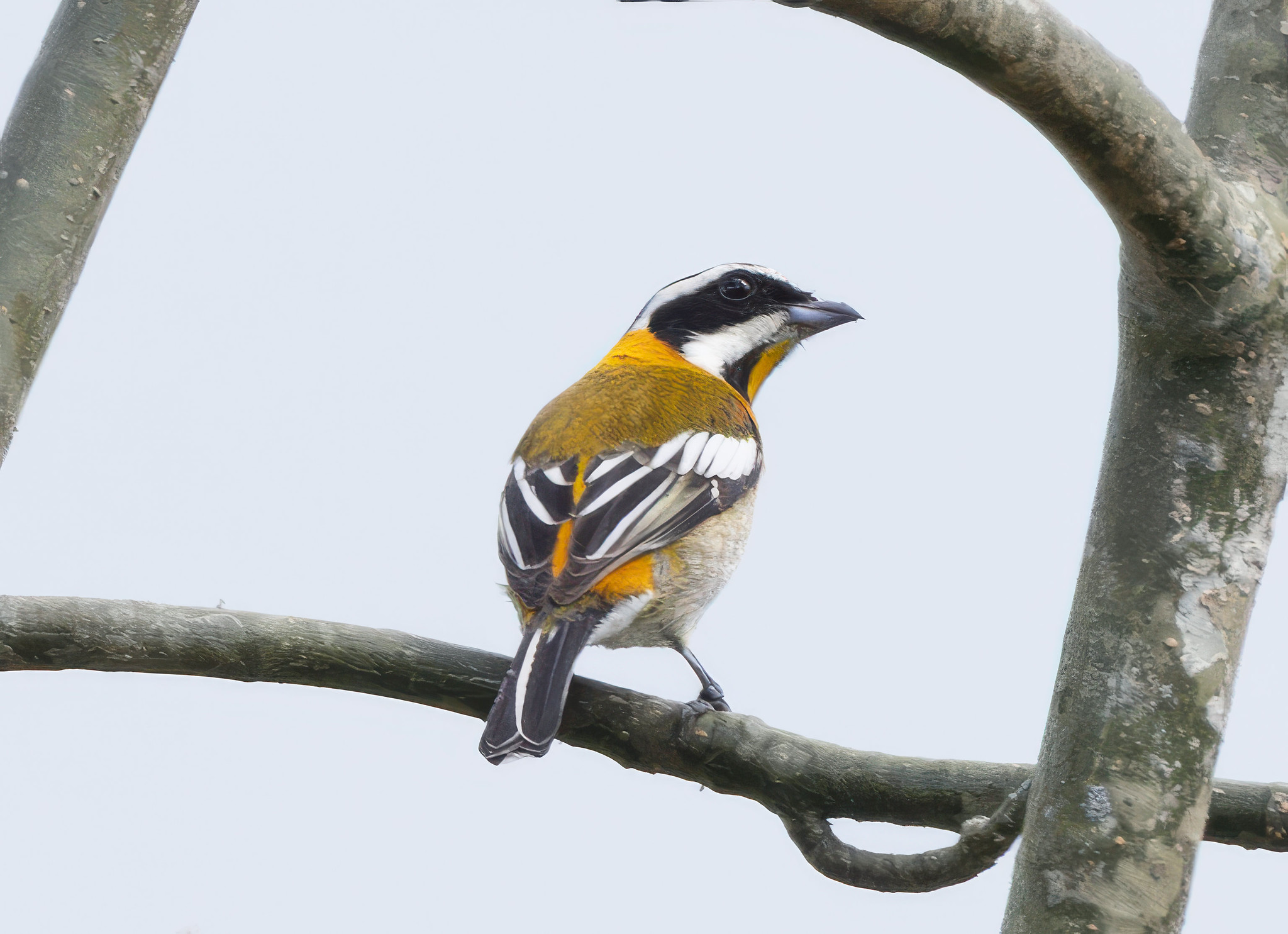
Soroa, Artemisa, Cuba

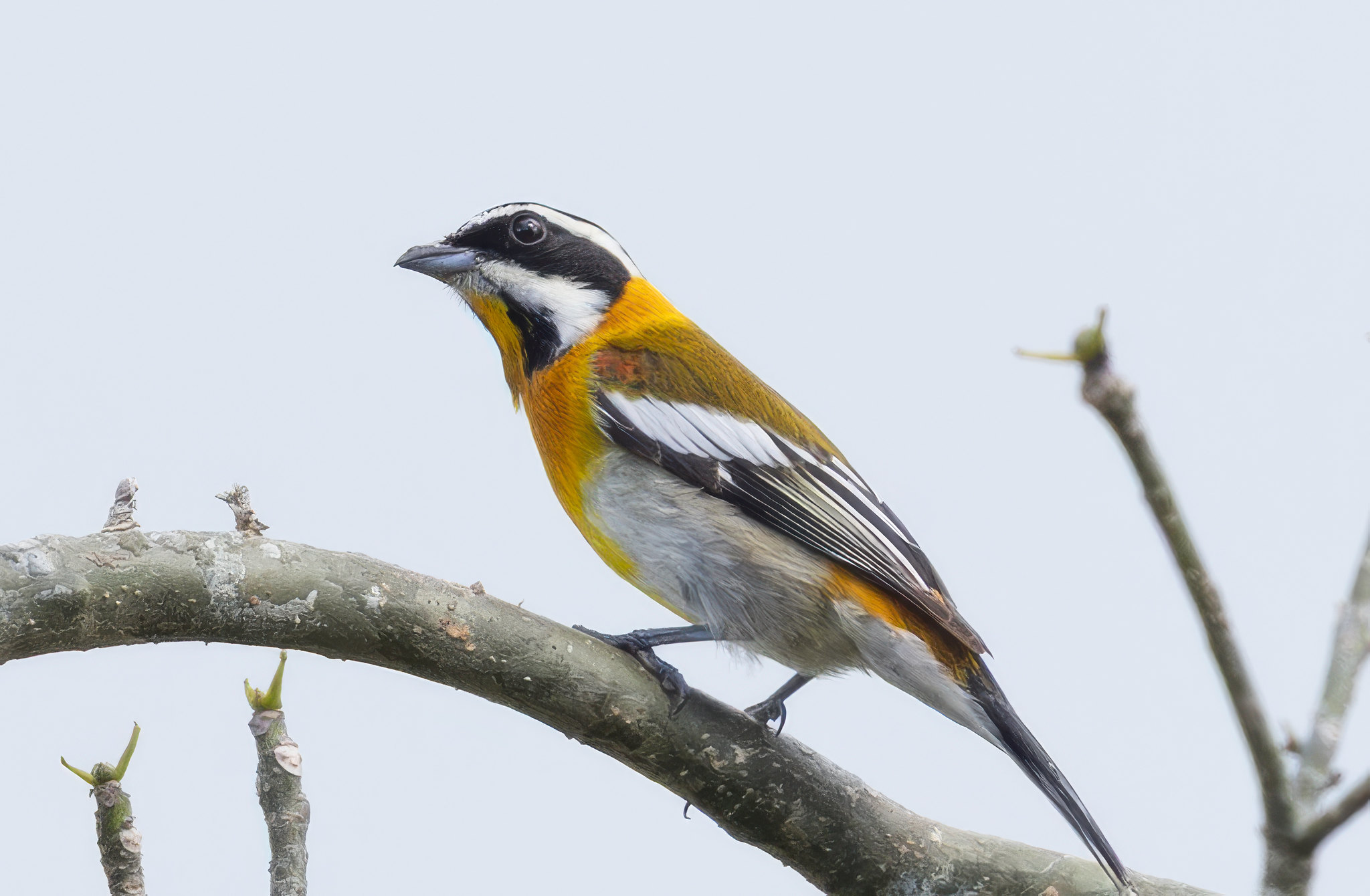
Soroa, Artemisa, Cuba

The western spindalis (Spindalis zena) is a songbird species. It was formerly considered conspecific with the other three species of Spindalis, with the common name stripe-headed tanager.

== Taxonomy ==
The western spindalis was formally described in 1758 by the Swedish naturalist Carl Linnaeus in the tenth edition of his Systema Naturae. He placed it with the finches in the genus Fringilla and coined the binomial name Fringilla zena. Linnaeus based his account on "The Bahama Finch" that had been described and illustrated in 1730 by the English naturalist Mark Catesby in his book The Natural History of Carolina, Florida and the Bahama Islands. Linnaeus specified the type locality as southern America but this was restricted in 1936 by the Austrian ornithologist Carl Eduard Hellmayr to New Providence in the Bahamas. The western spindalis is now one of the four species placed in the genus Spindalis that was introduced in 1837 by William Jardine and Prideaux John Selby. The specific epithet zena is from Ancient Greek ζηνα (zēna) with ζηνη (zēnē), a type of finch, probably the European goldfinch.

Five subspecies are recognised:

- S. z. townsendi Ridgway, 1887 – north Bahamas
- S. z. zena (Linnaeus, 1758) – central, south Bahamas
- S. z. pretrei (Lesson, RP, 1831) – Cuba and Isle of Pines
- S. z. salvini Cory, 1886 – Grand Cayman
- S. z. benedicti Ridgway, 1885 – Cozumel (off southeast Mexico)

The spindalises were traditionally considered aberrant tanagers of the family Thraupidae, but like the equally enigmatic bananaquit (Coereba flaveola), they are formally treated as incertae sedis (place uncertain) among the nine-primaried oscines until the recognition of the family Spindalidae.

== Color ==
The male is brightly colored with a black and white horizontally striped head and contrasting burnt orange throat, breast and nape. The remainder of the belly is light grey. There are two color variations: green-backed (generally northern) and black-backed (generally northern). The female has similar markings on the head, but washed out to a medium grey. She is olive-grey above and greyish-brown below, with a slight orange wash on the breast, rump, and shoulders.

== Size ==
The bird is 6.75 in (17.1 cm) long, has wingspan of 9.5 in (24 cm) and weighs 21 g (0.74 oz).

== Habitat and Ecology ==
The species is found in southeastern Florida and the western Caribbean (Cozumel, the Cayman Islands, Cuba, the Bahamas and the Turks and Caicos Islands). It is a rare visitor of extreme southern Florida, where the subspecies S. z. zena successfully bred in 2009.

Its natural habitats are subtropical or tropical moist lowland forests, subtropical or tropical moist montane forest, and heavily degraded former forest. The subspecies zena is found in pine forest and perches on fruit trees. It is a nonmigratory bird and has a lifespan of 3.29 years.

== Diet and Feeding Characteristics ==
They eat insects, larvae and fruit.

These birds use two different foraging techniques: they glean for fruits, meaning they pluck fruit from the source and they hover for fruits. They typically look for food at medium to high heights off the ground.

== Conservation ==
It is not considered a threatened species by the International Union for Conservation of Nature (IUCN).
