= List of endemic birds of the West Indies =

This article is one of a series providing information about endemism among birds in the world's various zoogeographic zones. For an overview of this subject see Endemism in birds.

== Patterns of endemism ==
This region is notable not just for the high number of endemic species, but for endemism in higher-level taxonomic groupings too. This article is one of a series providing information about endemism among birds in the world's various zoogeographic zones. For an overview of this subject see Endemism in birds.

=== Family-level endemism ===
The following families are endemic to the region:

- Palmchat, a passerine family (Dulidae), containing a single species found only on Hispaniola.
- the todies, a family (Todidae) with five species, found only on the Greater Antilles.
- the Cuban warblers, a passerine family (Teretistridae), containing two species on Cuba
- the Hispaniolan tanagers, Phaenicophilidae, a passerine family, containing 4 species in 3 genera on Hispaniola
- the Puerto Rican tanager, a passerine family (Nesospingidae), containing a single species found only on Puerto Rico
- the chat-tanagers (Calyptophilidae) a passerine family, containing 2 species found only on Hispaniola
- the spindalises, a passerine family (Spindalidae), with 4 species found only on the Greater Antilles and nearby islands

=== Genus-level endemism ===
In addition to genera in the families above, the following genera are endemic to the region:

- Riccordia, with six species, the blue-headed hummingbird, Puerto Rican emerald, Cuban emerald, Hispaniolan emerald, and the extinct Brace's emerald & Gould's emerald
- Margarops, with one species, the pearly-eyed thrasher
- Priotelus, with two species, the Cuban trogon and Hispaniolan trogon
- Melopyrrha, with four species, the Puerto Rican bullfinch, Cuban bullfinch, Greater Antillean bullfinch, and the extinct St. Kitts bullfinch

Six genera found only on Hispaniola:

- Nesoctites, with one species, the Antillean piculet (also monotypic within the subfamily)
- Dulus, with only one species, the palmchat (also monotypic within the family)
- Phaenicophilus, with two species, the black-crowned tanager and grey-crowned tanager
- Xenoligea, with one species, the white-winged warbler
- Microligea, with one species, the green-tailed warbler
- Calyptophilus, with two species, the western chat-tanager and eastern chat-tanager

Five genera found only on Jamaica:

- Trochilus, with two species, red-billed and black-billed streamertails
- Loxipasser, with one species, the yellow-shouldered grassquit
- Euneornis, with one species, the orangequit
- Nesopsar, with one species, the Jamaican blackbird

Six genera found only on Cuba:

- Ferminia, a genus with only one species, the Zapata wren
- Cyanolimnas, with one species, the Zapata rail
- Margarobyas, with one species, the bare-legged owl
- Starnoenas, with one species, the blue-headed quail-dove (depending on classification, the genus may also be monotypic to the subfamily level)
- Torreornis, with one species, the Zapata sparrow
- Xiphidiopicus, with one species, the Cuban green woodpecker

One genus found only on Puerto Rico:

- Gymnasio, with one species, the Puerto Rican owl (formerly also found in the Virgin Islands, but now likely extirpated there)

One genus found only on the Bahamas:

- Nesophlox, with two species, the Bahama woodstar and Inagua woodstar

The following genera are confined to the Lesser Antilles:

- Ramphocinclus, with a single species, the white-breasted thrasher
- Cinclocerthia, with two species, the gray trembler and the brown trembler
- Allenia, with one species, the scaly-breasted thrasher
- Loxigilla, with two species, the Lesser Antillean bullfinch and the Barbados bullfinch

In addition in the following genera, a high proportions of the member species are endemic to the west Indies:

== Endemic Bird Areas ==
Birdlife International has defined a number of Endemic Bird Areas in the West Indies.

025	Cuba
026	Bahamas
027	Jamaica
028	Hispaniola
029	Puerto Rico and the Virgin Islands
030	Lesser Antilles

They have also defined the following secondary areas:

== List of species ==
=== Species endemic to Cuba ===
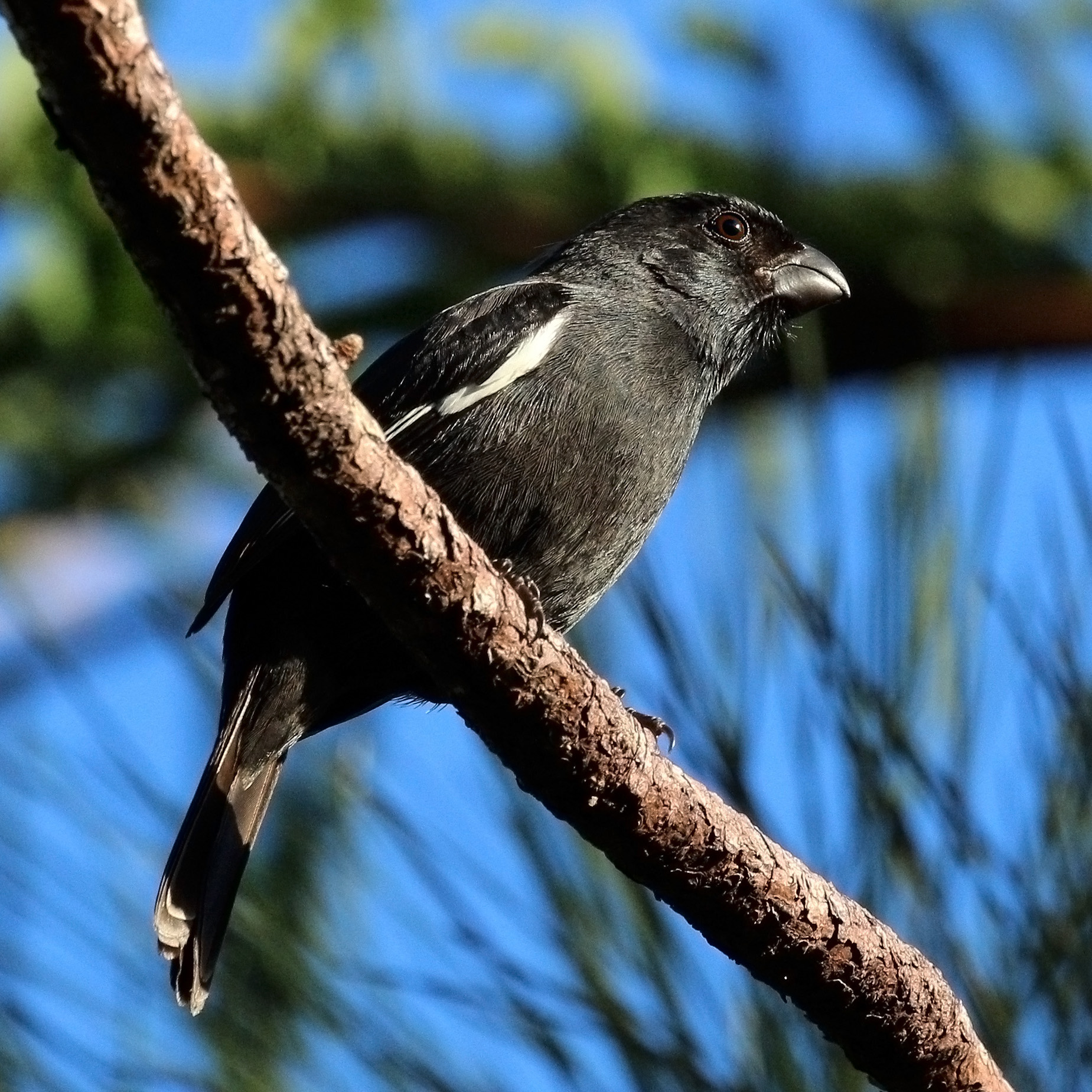
Cuban bullfinch, Melopyrrha nigra

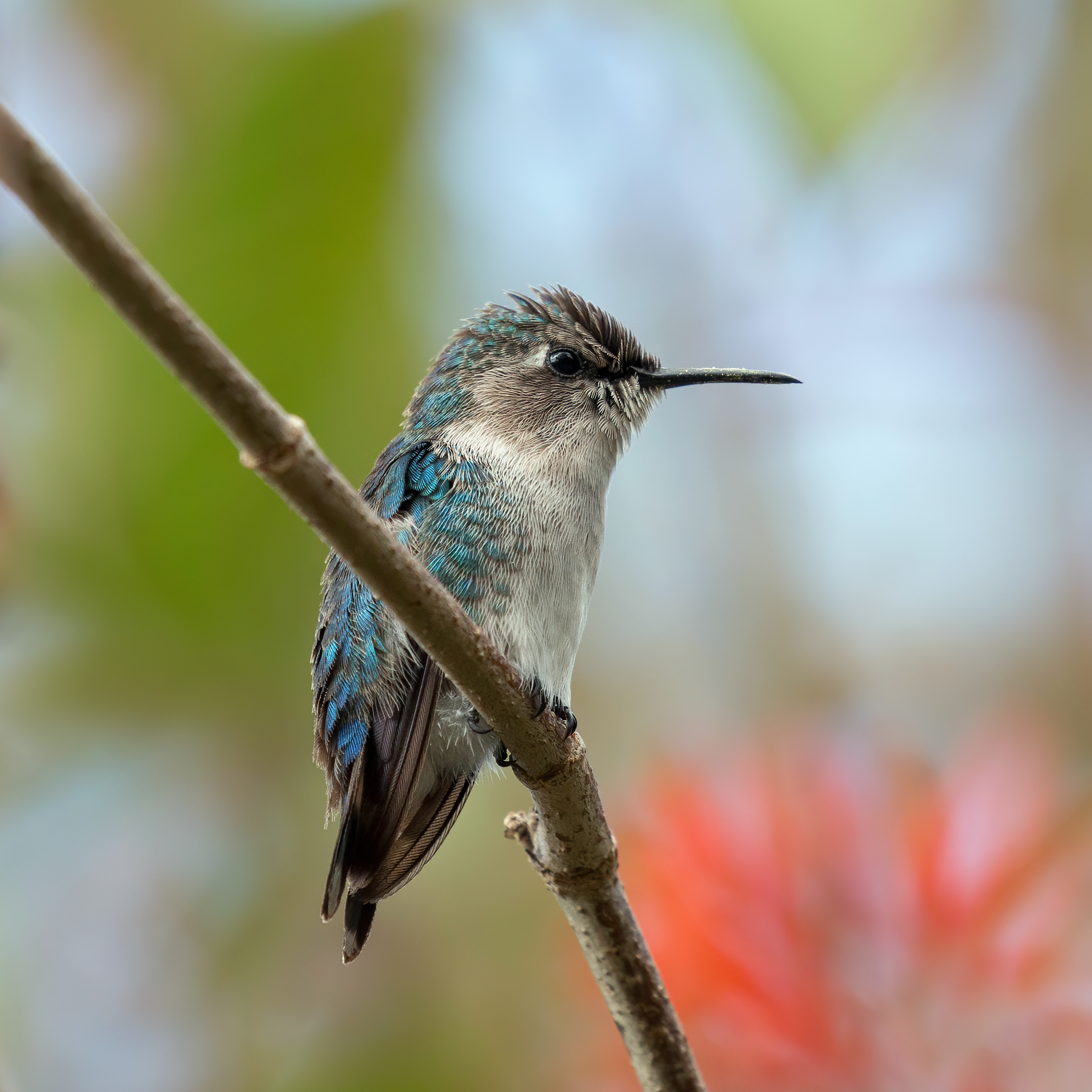
Bee hummingbird, Mellisuga helenae

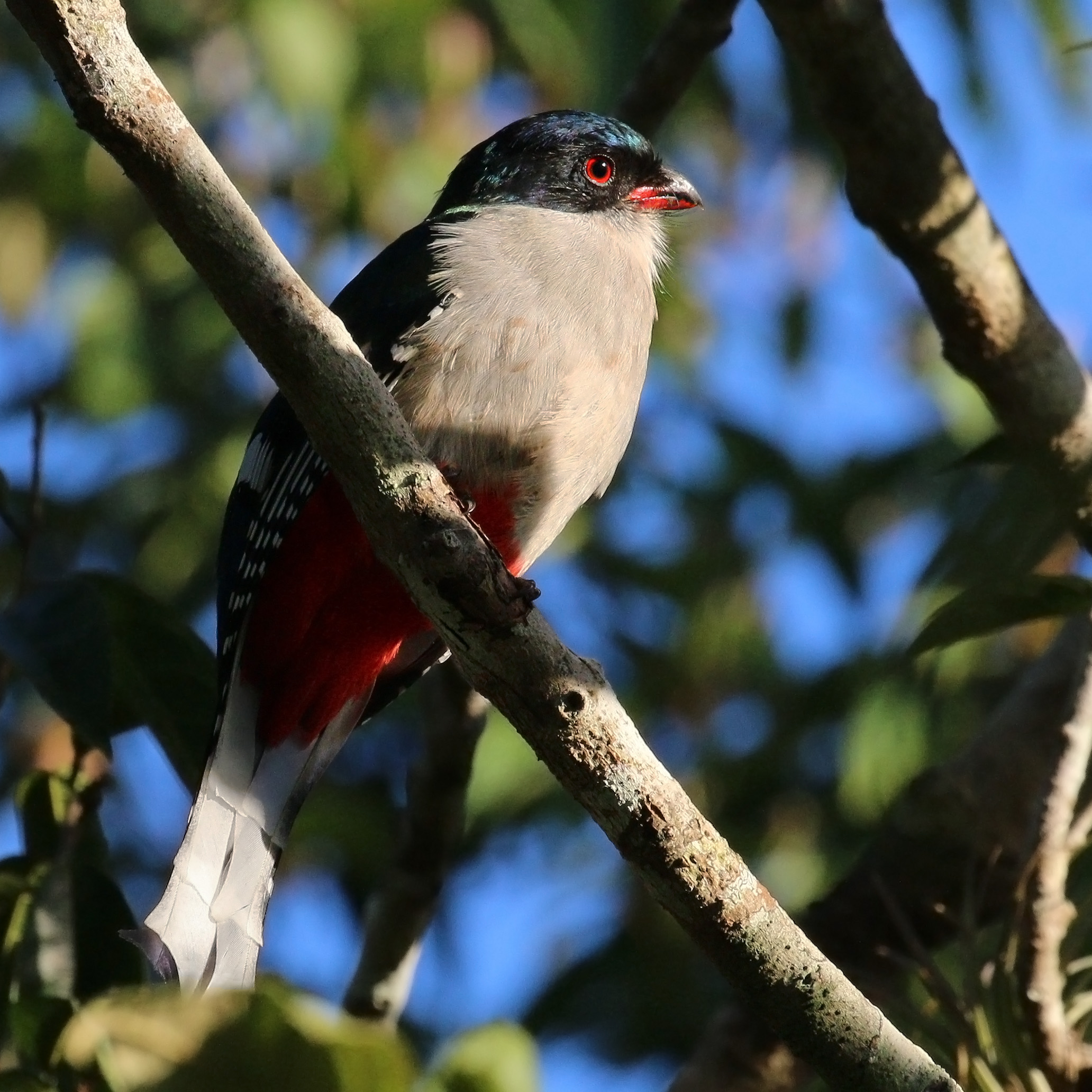
Cuban trogon, Priotelus temnurus

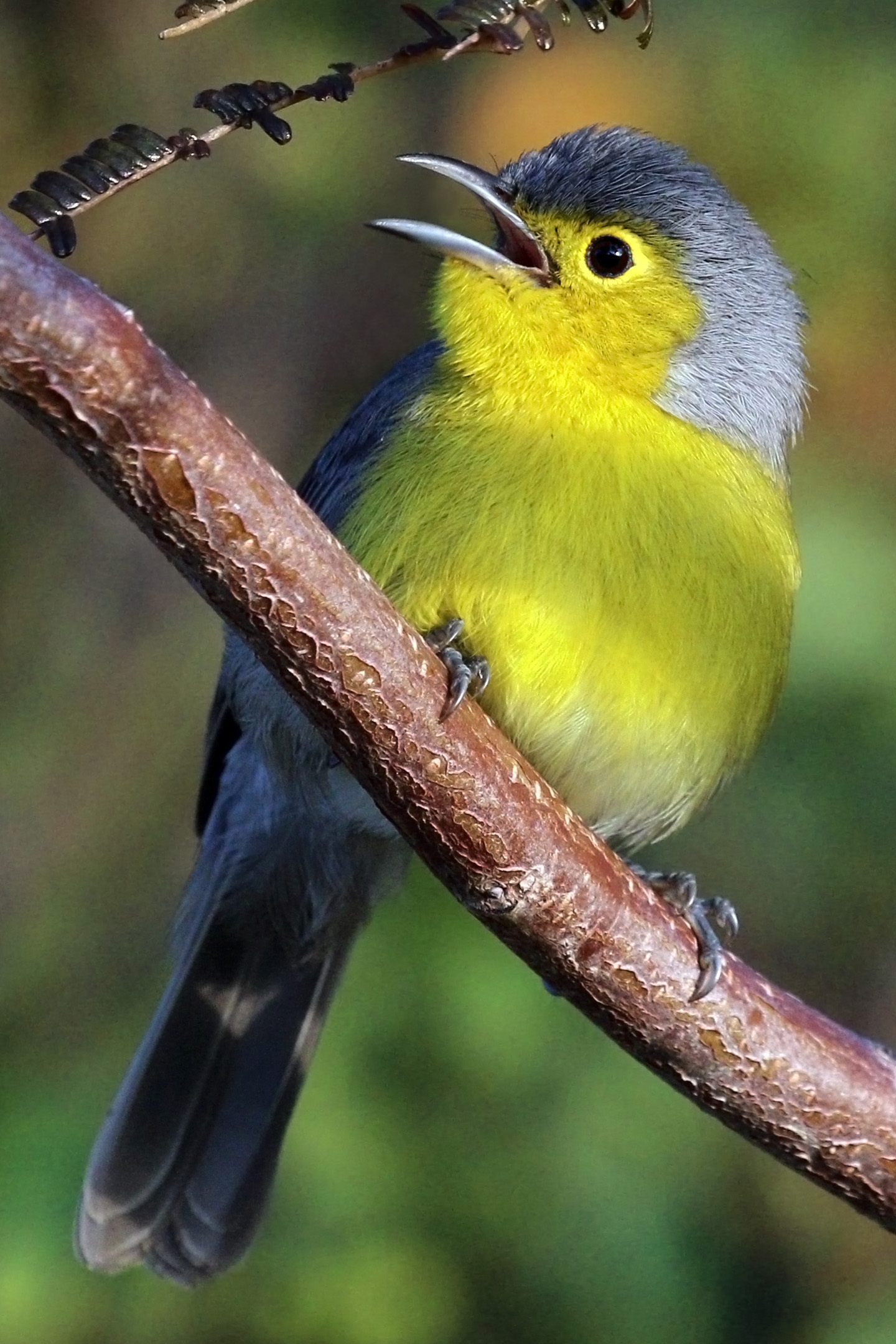
Oriente warbler, Teretistris fornsi

Common name	Binomial	Family	Status	Notes
Cuban kite	Chondrohierax wilsonii	Accipitridae		Sometimes considered a subspecies of hook-billed kite.
Gundlach's hawk	Accipiter gundlachi	Accipitridae		
Cuban black hawk	Buteogallus gundlachii	Accipitridae		
Zapata rail	Cyanolimnas cerverai	Rallidae		
Grey-fronted quail-dove	Geotrygon caniceps	Columbidae		
Blue-headed quail-dove	Starnoenas cyanocephala	Columbidae		
Cuban parakeet	Psittacara euops	Psittacidae		Extirpated from Isla de la Juventud
Bare-legged owl	Margarobyas lawrencii	Strigidae		
Cuban pygmy owl	Glaucidium siju	Strigidae		
Cuban nightjar	Antrostomus cubanensis	Caprimulgidae		
Bee hummingbird	Mellisuga helenae	Trochilidae		World's smallest bird.
Cuban trogon	Priotelus temnurus	Trogonidae		
Cuban tody	Todus multicolor	Todidae		
Cuban green woodpecker	Xiphidiopicus percussus	Picidae		
Fernandina's flicker	Colaptes fernandinae	Picidae		
Giant kingbird	Tyrannus cubensis	Tyrannidae		
Cuban martin	Progne cryptoleuca	Hirundinidae		Probably winters somewhere in South America, though this is not confirmed.
Cuban crow	Corvus nasicus	Corvidae		
Zapata wren	Ferminia cerverai	Troglodytidae		
Cuban gnatcatcher	Polioptila lembeyei	Polioptilidae		
Cuban solitaire	Myadestes elisabeth	Turdidae		
Cuban vireo	Vireo gundlachii	Vireonidae		
Yellow-headed warbler	Teretistris fernandinae	Parulidae		
Oriente warbler	Teretistris fornsi	Parulidae		
Cuban grassquit	Tiaris canorus	Thraupidae		
Zapata sparrow	Torreornis inexpectata	Passerellidae		
Red-shouldered blackbird	Agelaius assimilis	Icteridae		
Cuban blackbird	Dives atroviolaceus	Icteridae		
Cuban oriole	Icterus melanopsis	Icteridae		

=== Species endemic to Hispaniola ===
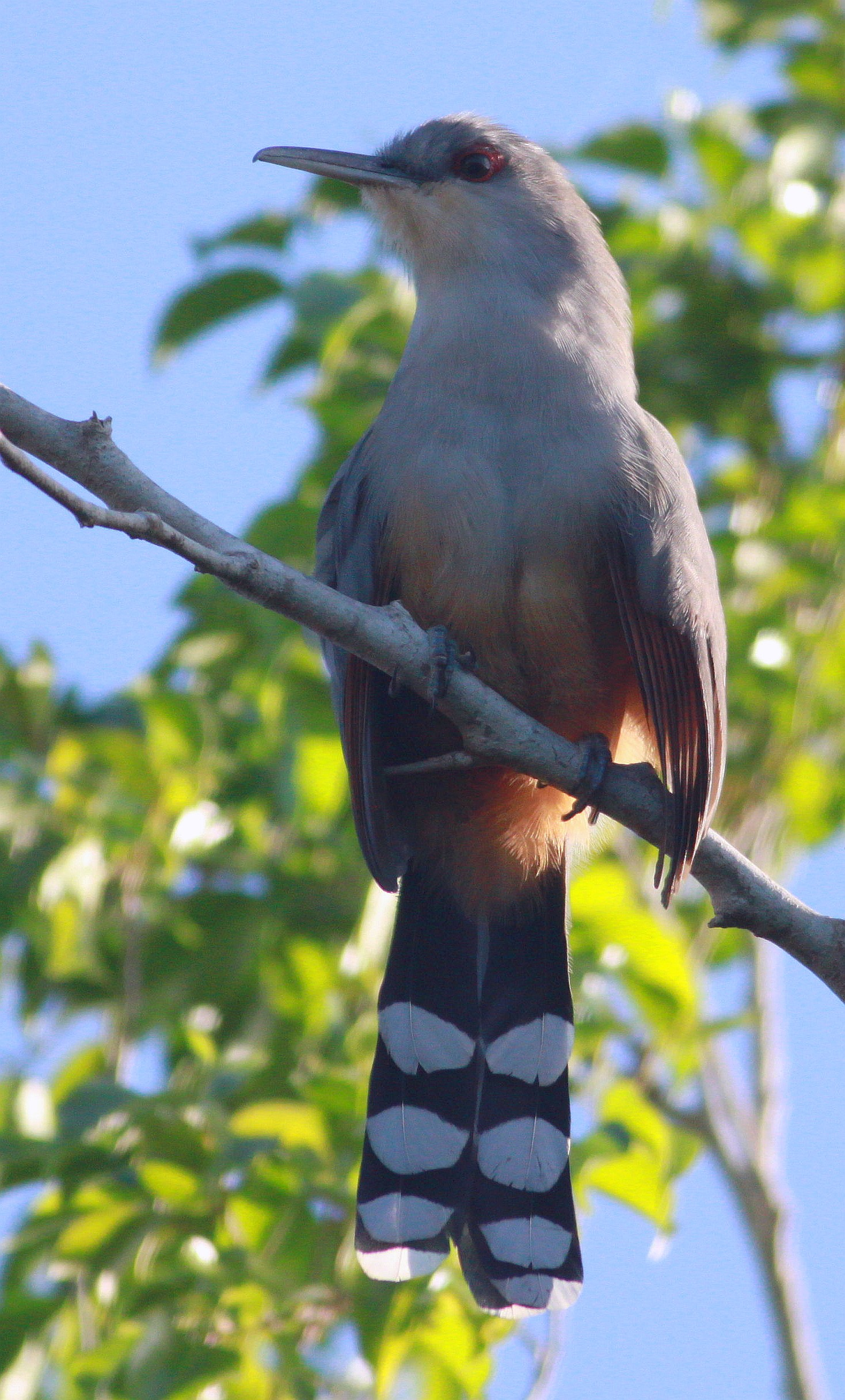
Hispaniolan lizard cuckoo, Coccyzus longirostris

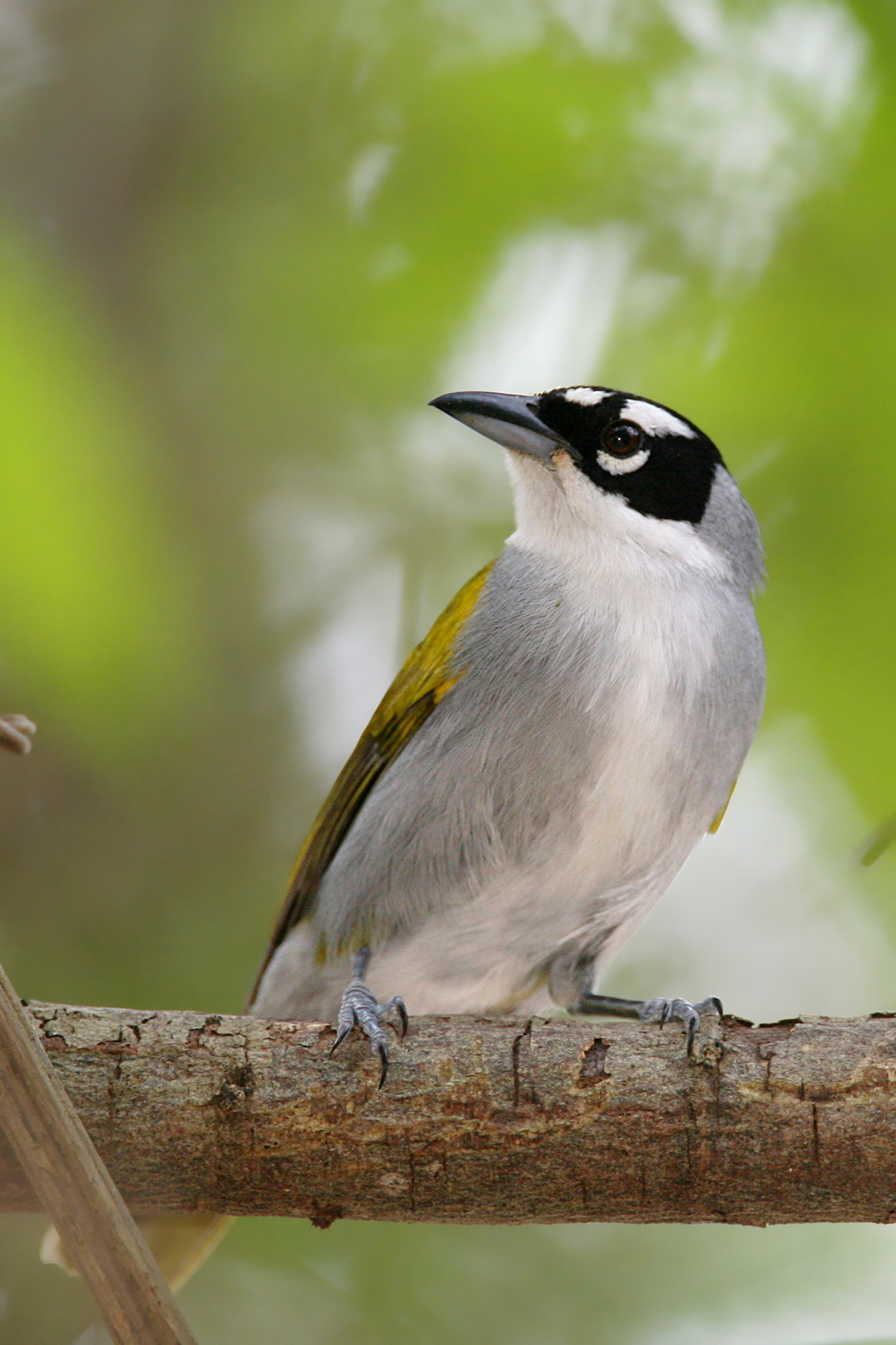
Black-crowned palm-tanager, Phaenicophilus palmarum

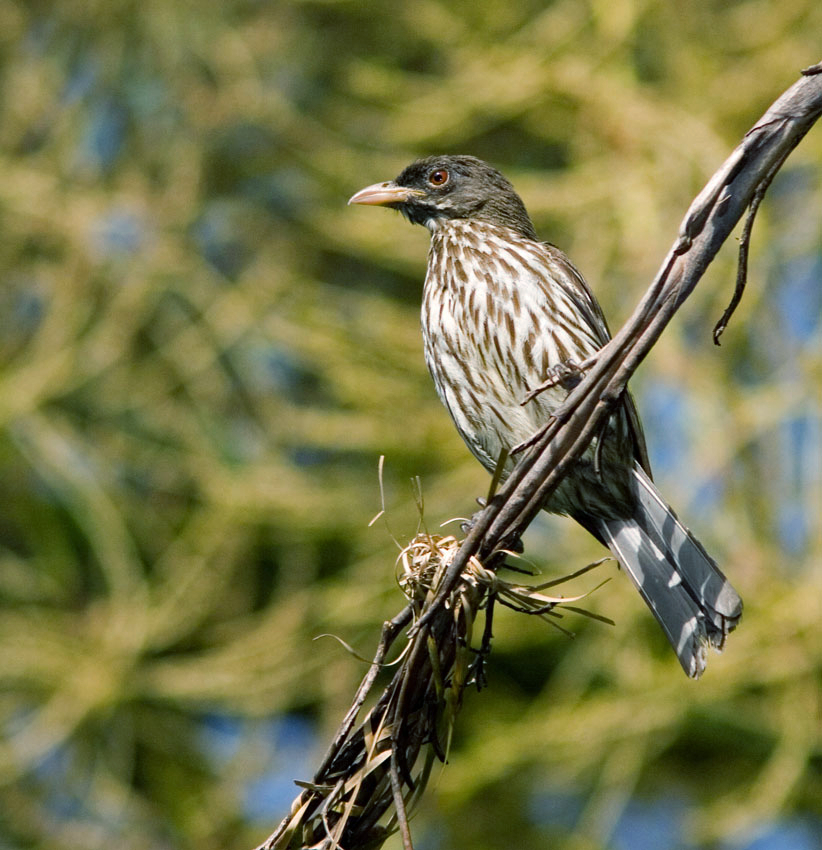
Palmchat, Dulus dominicus

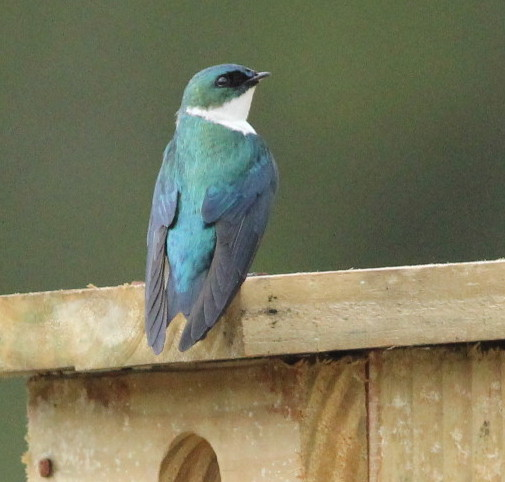
Golden swallow, Tachycineta euchrysea

Common name	Binomial	Family	Status	Notes
Hispaniolan mango	Anthracothorax dominicus	Trochilidae		
Ridgway's hawk	Buteo ridgwayi	Accipitridae		
Hispaniolan lizard cuckoo	Coccyzus longirostris	Cuculidae		
Bay-breasted cuckoo	Coccyzus rufigularis	Cuculidae		Dominican Republic endemic.
Ashy-faced owl	Tyto glaucops	Strigidae		
Least poorwill	Siphonorhis brewsteri	Caprimulgidae		
Hispaniolan nightjar	Antrostomus ekmani	Caprimulgidae		
Hispaniolan emerald	Riccordia swainsonii	Trochilidae		
Hispaniolan trogon	Priotelus roseigaster	Trogonidae		
Broad-billed tody	Todus subbulatus	Todidae		
Narrow-billed tody	Todus angustirostris	Todidae		
Antillean piculet	Nesoctites micromegas	Picidae		
Hispaniolan woodpecker	Melanerpes striatus	Picidae		
Hispaniolan pewee	Contopus hispaniolensis	Tyrannidae		
White-necked crow	Corvus leucognaphalus	Corvidae		Extirpated from Puerto Rico.
Golden swallow	Tachycineta euchrysea	Hirundinidae		Extirpated from Jamaica.
La Selle thrush	Turdus swalesi	Turdidae		
Palmchat	Dulus dominicus	Dulidae		
Flat-billed vireo	Vireo nanus	Vireonidae		
Green-tailed warbler	Microligea palustris	Phaenicophilidae		
White-winged warbler	Xenoligea montana	Phaenicophilidae		
Black-crowned palm-tanager	Phaenicophilus palmarum	Phaenicophilidae		
Gray-crowned palm-tanager	Phaenicophilus poliocephalus	Phaenicophilidae		
Hispaniolan spindalis	Spindalis dominicensis	Spindalidae		
Western chat-tanager	Calyptophilus tertius	Incertae sedis		Formerly conspecific with eastern chat-tanager.
Eastern chat-tanager	Calyptophilus frugivorus	Incertae sedis		Formerly conspecific with western chat-tanager.
Hispaniolan oriole	Icterus dominicensis	Icteridae		
Antillean siskin	Spinus dominicensis	Fringillidae		
Hispaniolan crossbill	Loxia megaplaga	Fringillidae		
White-fronted quail-dove	Geotrygon leucometopia	Columbidae		Dominican Republic endemic.
Hispaniolan parrot	Amazona ventralis	Psittacidae		Introduced to Puerto Rico.
Hispaniolan parakeet	Psittacara chloropterus	Psittacidae		Various feral populations exist in Puerto Rico, Guadeloupe, and Florida.

=== Species endemic to Jamaica ===
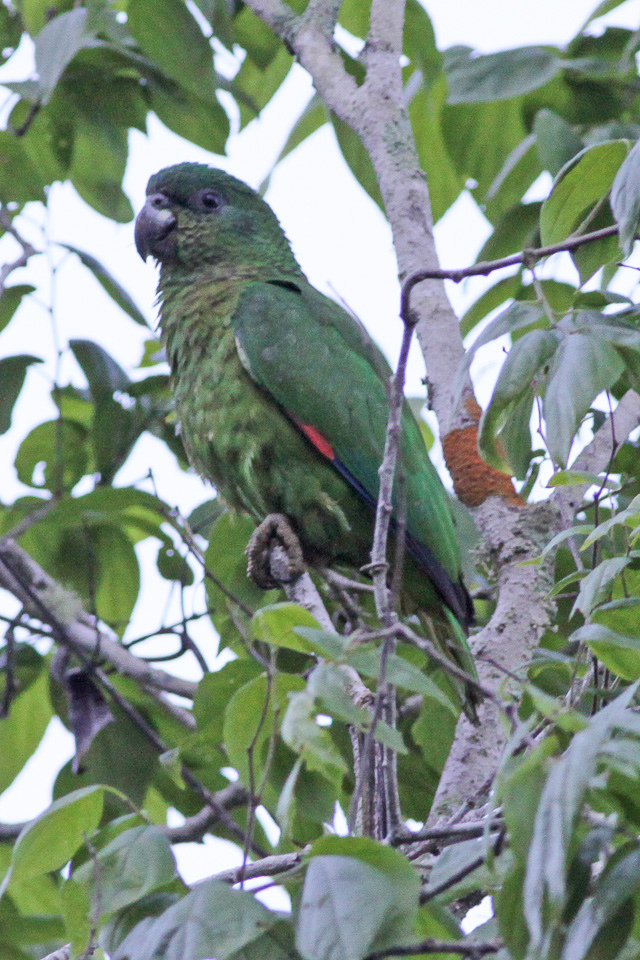
Black-billed amazon, Amazona agilis

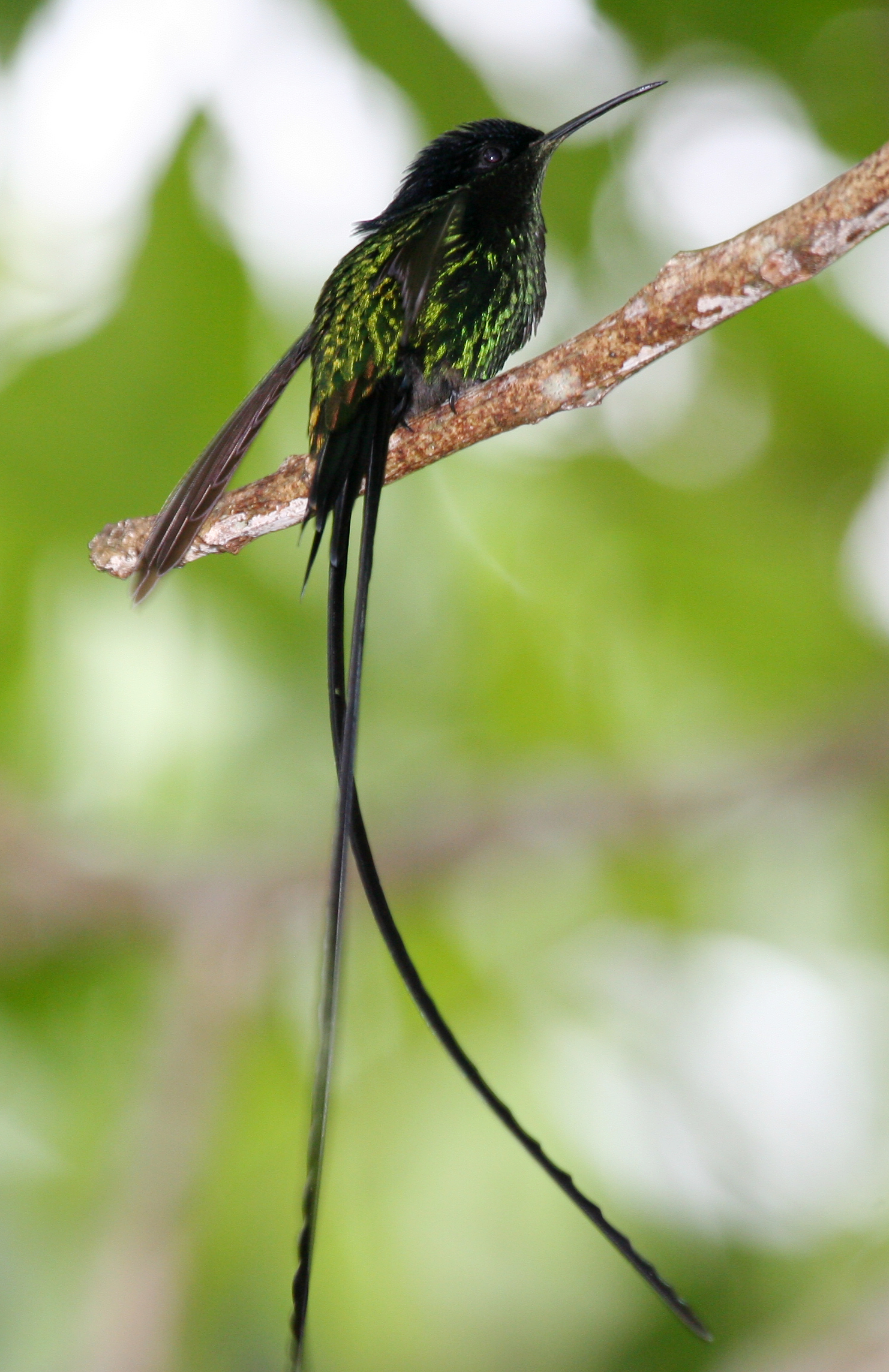
Black-billed streamertail, Amazona agilis

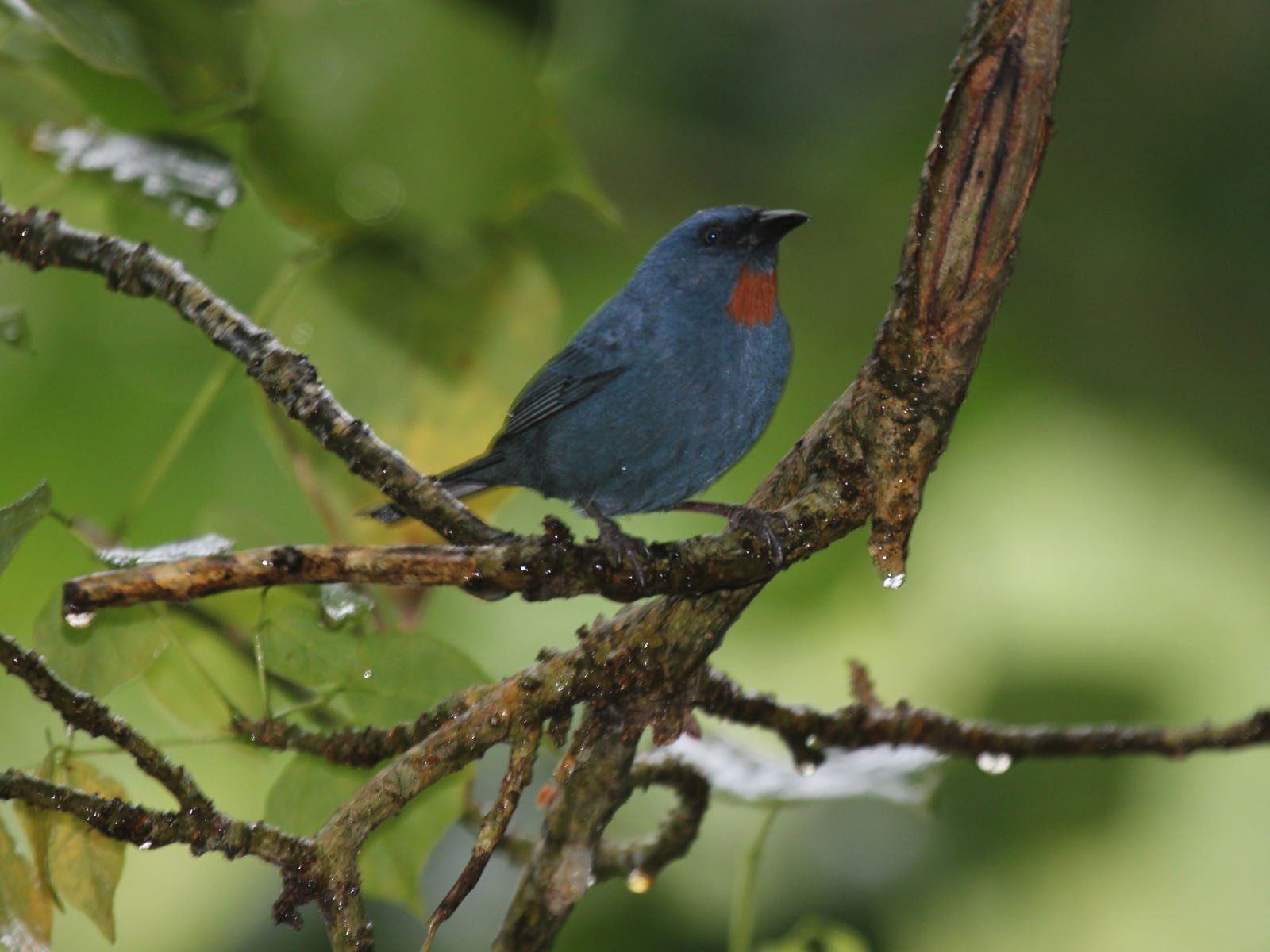
Orangequit, Euneornis campestris

Common name	Binomial	Family	Status	Notes
Ring-tailed pigeon	Patagioenas caribaea	Columbidae		
Crested quail-dove	Geotrygon versicolor	Columbidae		
Yellow-billed amazon	Amazona collaria	Psittacidae		
Black-billed amazon	Amazona agilis	Psittacidae		
Jamaican lizard cuckoo	Coccyzus vetula	Cuculidae		
Chestnut-bellied cuckoo	Coccyzus pluvialis	Cuculidae		
Jamaican owl	Asio grammicus	Strigidae		
Jamaican poorwill	Siphonorhis americana	Caprimulgidae	Possibly extinct	Possibly extinct, hasn't been definitively seen since 1860.
Jamaican mango	Anthracothorax mango	Trochilidae		
Black-billed streamertail	Trochilus scitulus	Trochilidae		
Red-billed streamertail	Trochilus polytmus	Trochilidae		
Jamaican tody	Todus todus	Todidae		
Jamaican woodpecker	Melanerpes radiolatus	Picidae		
Jamaican elaenia	Myiopagis cotta	Tyrannidae		
Jamaican pewee	Contopus pallidus	Tyrannidae		
Sad flycatcher	Myiarchus barbirostris	Tyrannidae		
Rufous-tailed flycatcher	Myiarchus validus	Tyrannidae		
Jamaican becard	Pachyramphus niger	Tyrannidae		
Jamaican crow	Corvus jamaicensis	Corvidae		
White-eyed thrush	Turdus jamaicensis	Turdidae		
White-chinned thrush	Turdus aurantius	Turdidae		
Jamaican vireo	Vireo modestus	Vireonidae		
Blue Mountain vireo	Vireo osburni	Vireonidae		
Arrow-headed warbler	Setophaga pharetra	Parulidae		
Jamaican euphonia	Euphonia jamaica	Fringillidae		
Yellow-shouldered grassquit	Loxipasser anoxanthus	Fringillidae		
Jamaican spindalis	Spindalis nigricephala	Spindalidae		
Orangequit	Euneornis campestris	Thraupidae		
Jamaican blackbird	Nesopsar nigerrimus	Icteridae		
Jamaican oriole	Icterus leucopteryx	Icteridae		Formerly found on Grand Cayman, currently extant on San Andrés.
Jamaican petrel	Pterodroma caribbaea	Procellariidae	Possibly extinct	Possibly extinct; formerly would have bred on Dominica and Guadeloupe. Last specimen collected in 1879. Surveys have been conducted, though nocturnal petrels are renowned for how hard they are to study.

=== Species endemic to Puerto Rico ===
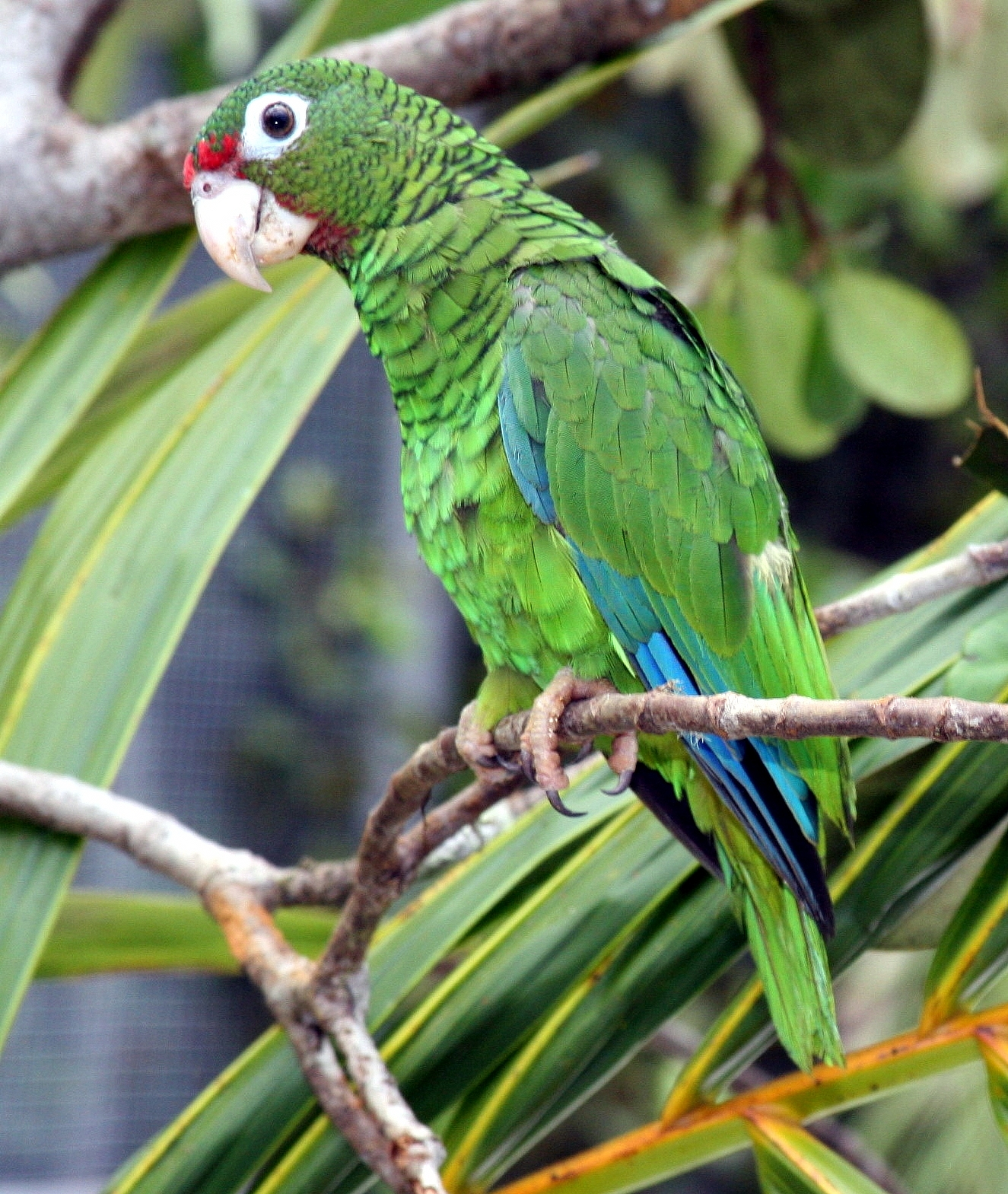
Puerto Rican amazon, Amazona vittata

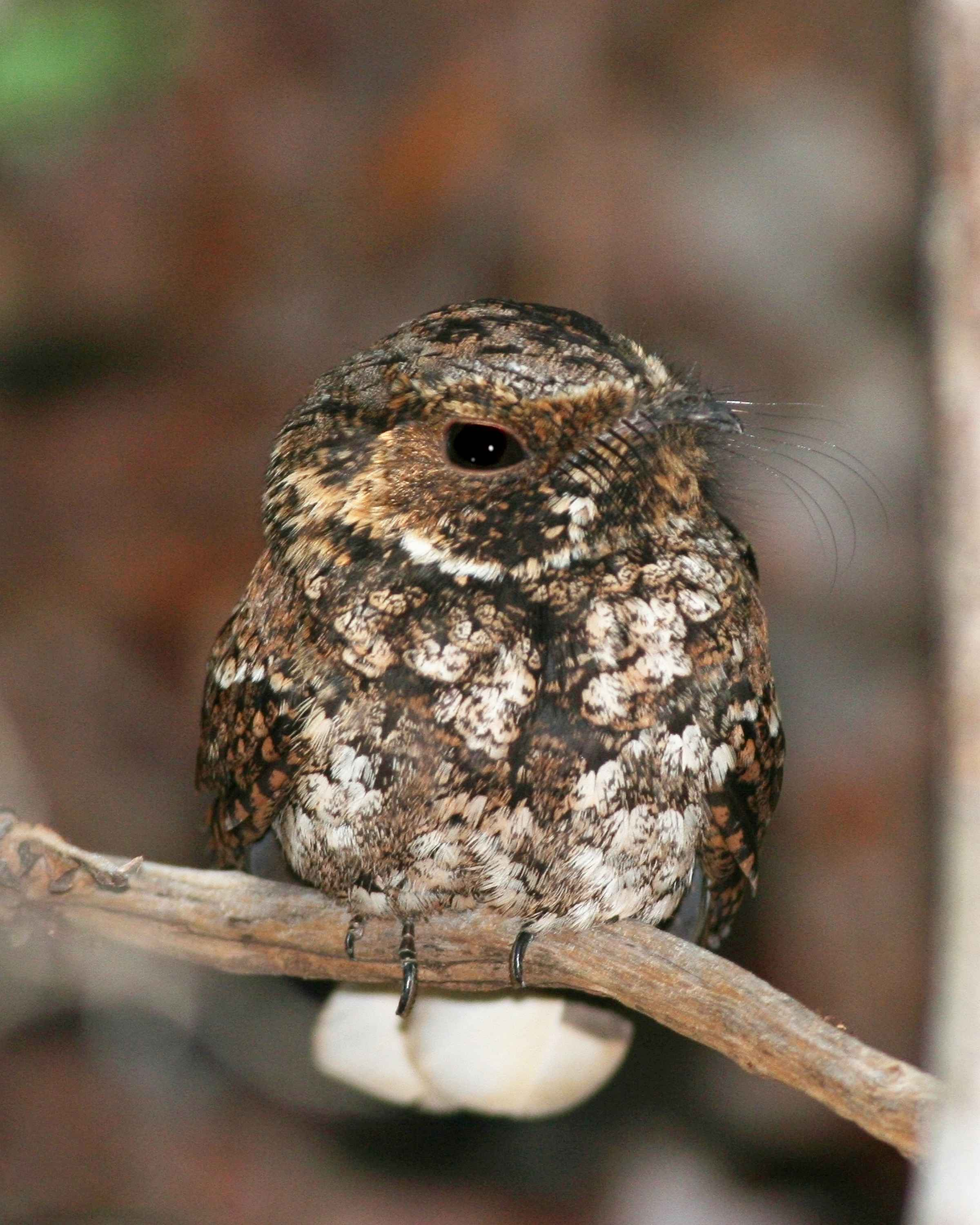
Puerto Rican nightjar, Antrostomus noctitherus

Common name	Binomial	Family	Status	Notes
Puerto Rican amazon	Amazona vittata	Psittacidae		Currently being reintroduced to parts of the island.
Puerto Rican lizard cuckoo	Coccyzus vieilloti	Cuculidae		
Puerto Rican owl	Gymnasio nudipes	Strigidae		
Puerto Rican nightjar	Antrostomus noctitherus	Caprimulgidae		
Green mango	Anthracothorax viridis	Trochilidae		
Puerto Rican emerald	Riccordia maugaeus	Trochilidae		
Puerto Rican tody	Todus mexicanus	Todidae		
Puerto Rican woodpecker	Melanerpes portoricensis	Picidae		
Puerto Rican flycatcher	Myiarchus antillarum	Tyrannidae		
Puerto Rican vireo	Vireo latimeri	Vireonidae		
Adelaide's warbler	Setophaga adelaidae	Parulidae		
Elfin woods warbler	Setophaga angelae	Parulidae		
Puerto Rican spindalis	Spindalis portoricensis	Spindalidae		
Puerto Rican tanager	Nesospingus speculiferus	Nesospingidae		
Puerto Rican bullfinch	Melopyrrha portoricensis	Thraupidae		
Yellow-shouldered blackbird	Agelaius xanthomus	Icteridae		
Puerto Rican oriole	Icterus portoricensis	Icteridae		

=== Other insular endemics of the West Indies ===
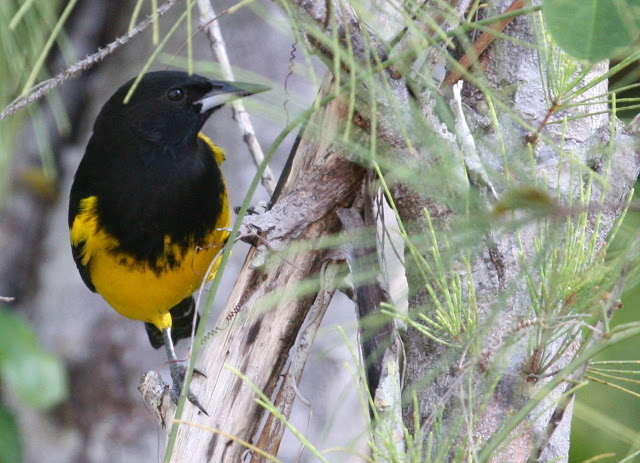
Bahama oriole, Icterus northropi

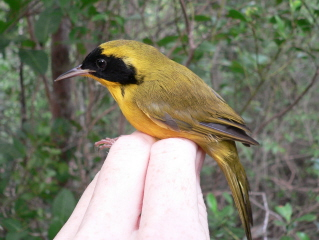
Bahama yellowthroat, Geothlypis rostrata

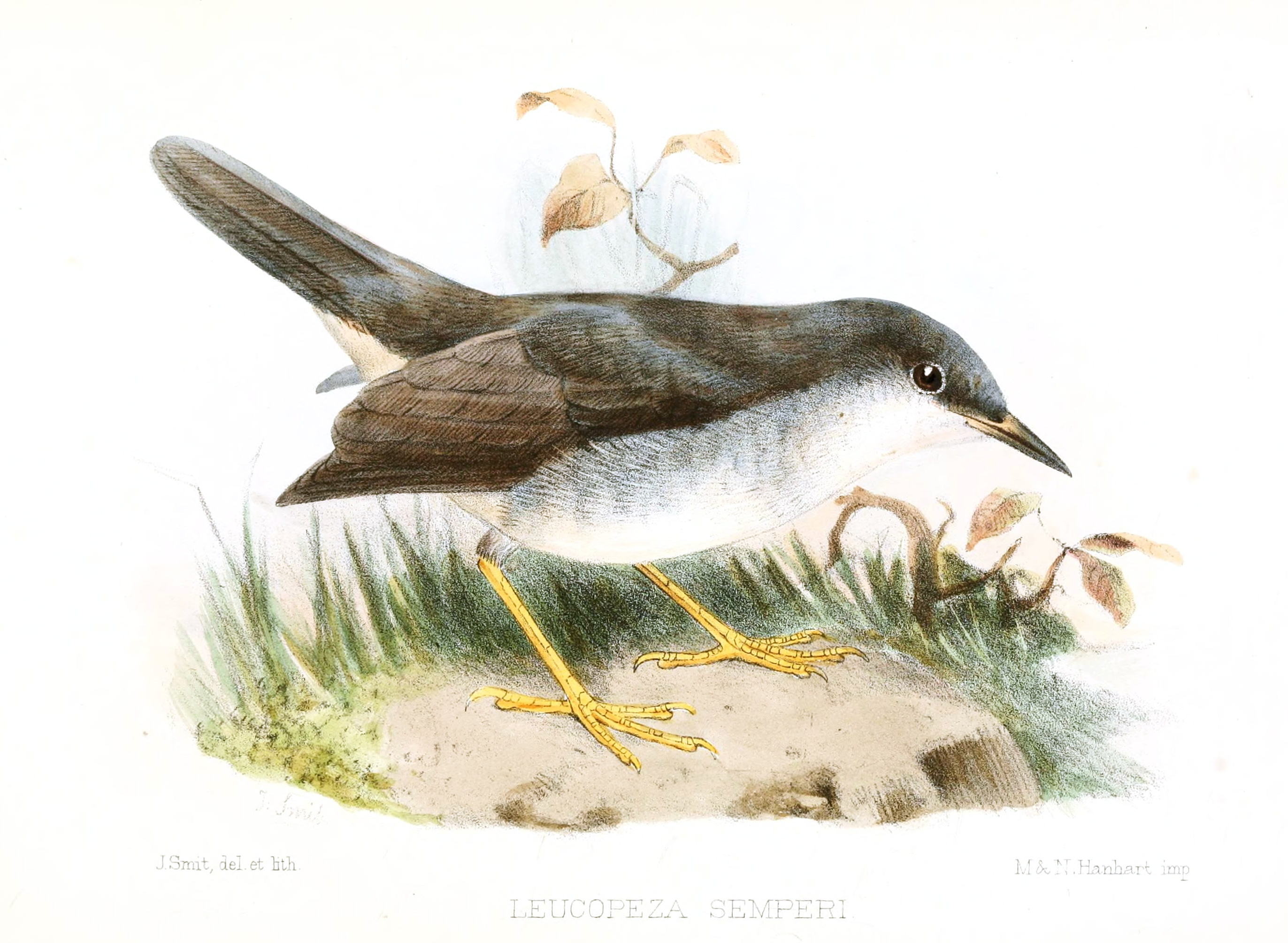
Semper's warbler, Leucopaza semperi

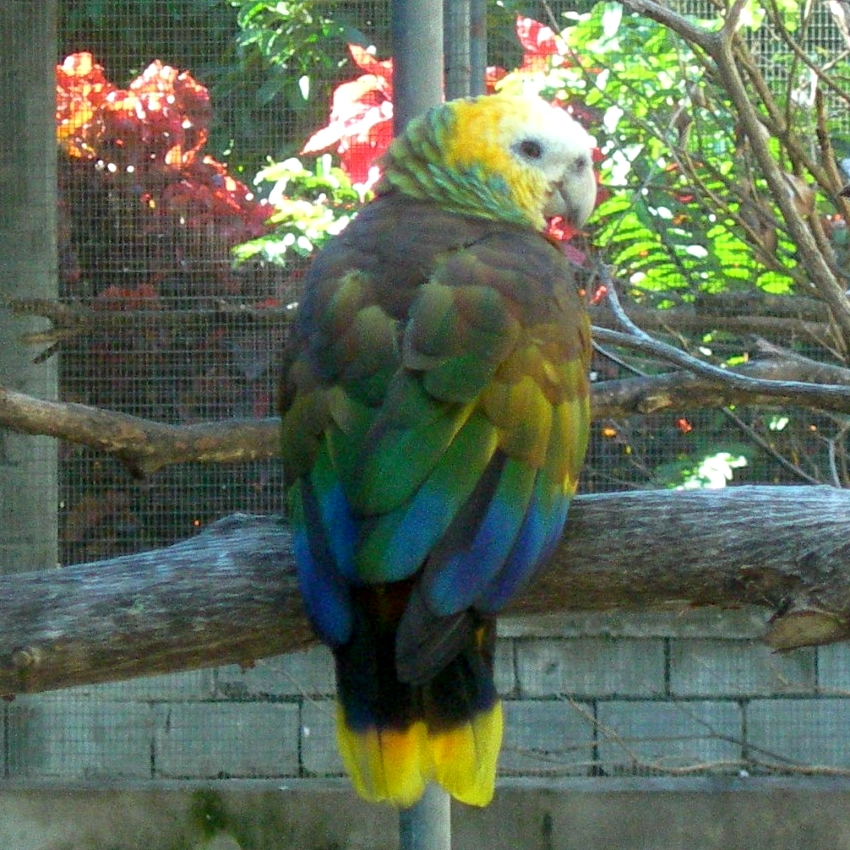
St. Vincent amazon, Amazona guildingii

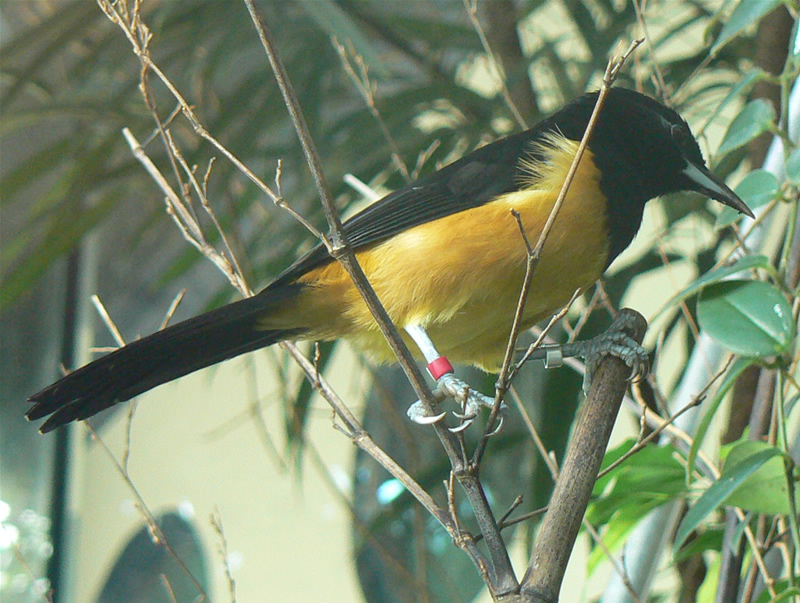
Montserrat oriole, Icterus oberi

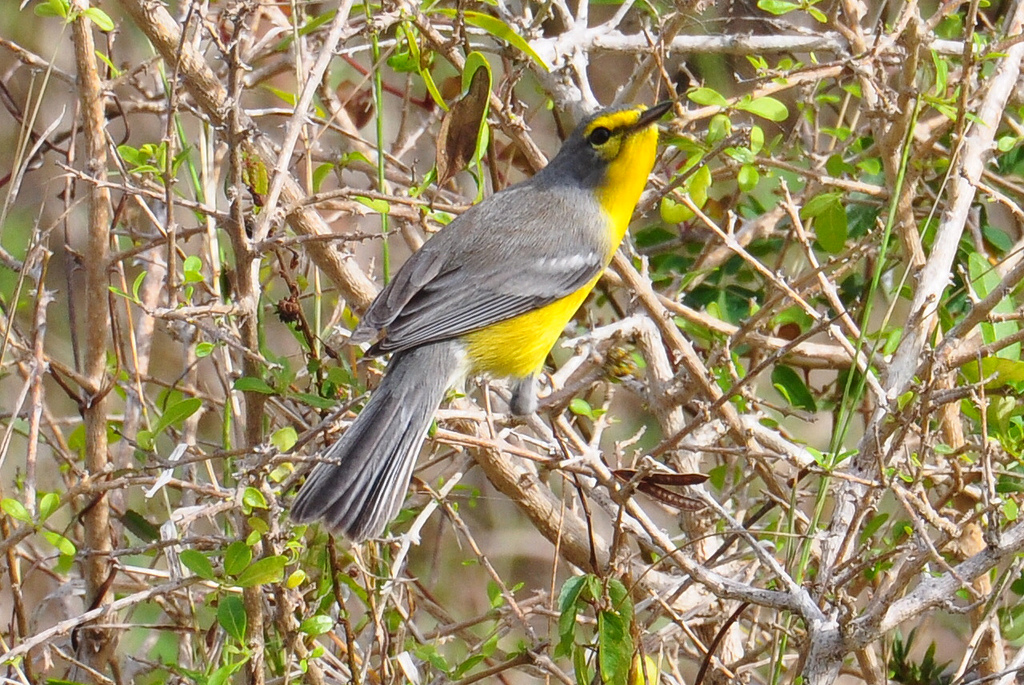
Barbuda warbler, Setophaga subita

Common name	Binomial	Family	Status	Notes
Species endemic to the Bahamas
Bahama woodstar	Nesophlox evelynae	Trochilidae		
Inagua woodstar	Nesophlox lyrura	Trochilidae		
Bahama swallow	Tachycineta cyaneoviridis	Hirundinidae		
Bahama nuthatch	Sitta insularis	Sittidae		Possibly extinct following Hurricane Dorian
Bahama oriole	Icterus northropi	Icteridae		
Bahama yellowthroat	Geothlypis rostrata	Parulidae		
Bahama warbler	Setophaga flavescens	Parulidae		
Species endemic to Grenada
Grenada dove	Leptotila wellsi	Columbidae		National bird of Grenada.
Species endemic to Dominica
Imperial parrot	Amazona imperialis	Psittacidae		National bird of Dominica.
Red-necked amazon	Amazona arausiaca	Psittacidae		
Kalinago wren	Troglodytes martinicensis	Troglodytidae		Formerly found on the islands of Martinique and Guadeloupe.
Species endemic to St. Lucia
St. Lucia amazon	Amazona versicolor	Psittacidae		
St. Lucia oriole	Icterus laudabilis	Icteridae		
Semper's warbler	Leucopaza semperi	Parulidae		After not being reliably reported since 1961, some have speculated that Semper's warbler is already extinct.
St. Lucia warbler	Setophaga delicata	Parulidae		
St. Lucia black finch	Melanospiza richardsoni	Fringillidae		
Species endemic to St. Vincent
St. Vincent amazon	Amazona guildingii	Psittacidae		
Whistling warbler	Catharopeza bishopi	Parulidae		
Species endemic to Guadeloupe
Guadeloupe woodpecker	Melanerpes herminieri	Picidae		
Species endemic to Barbuda
Barbuda warbler	Setophaga subita	Parulidae		
Species endemic to Barbados
Barbados bullfinch	Loxigilla barbadensis	Thraupidae		
Species endemic to Montserrat
Montserrat oriole	Icterus oberi	Icteridae		
Species endemic to Martinique
Martinique oriole	Icterus bonana	Icteridae		
Species endemic to San Andrés
San Andres vireo	Vireo caribaeus	Vireonidae		
Species endemic to Trinidad
Trinidad motmot	Momotus bahamensis	Momotidae		
Trinidad piping guan	Pipile pipile	Cracidae		

=== Other species endemic to the Greater Antilles ===
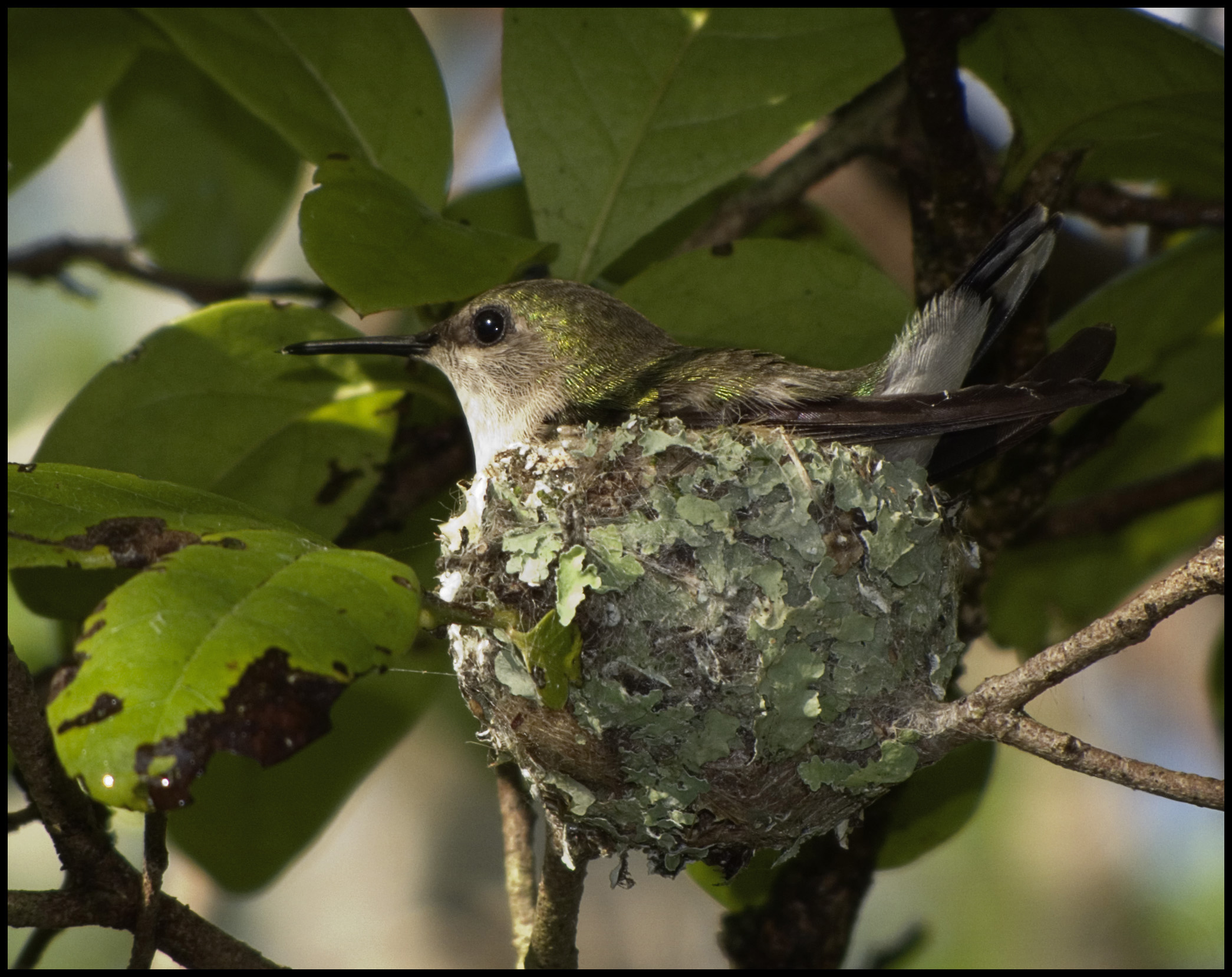
Vervain hummingbird, Mellisuga minima

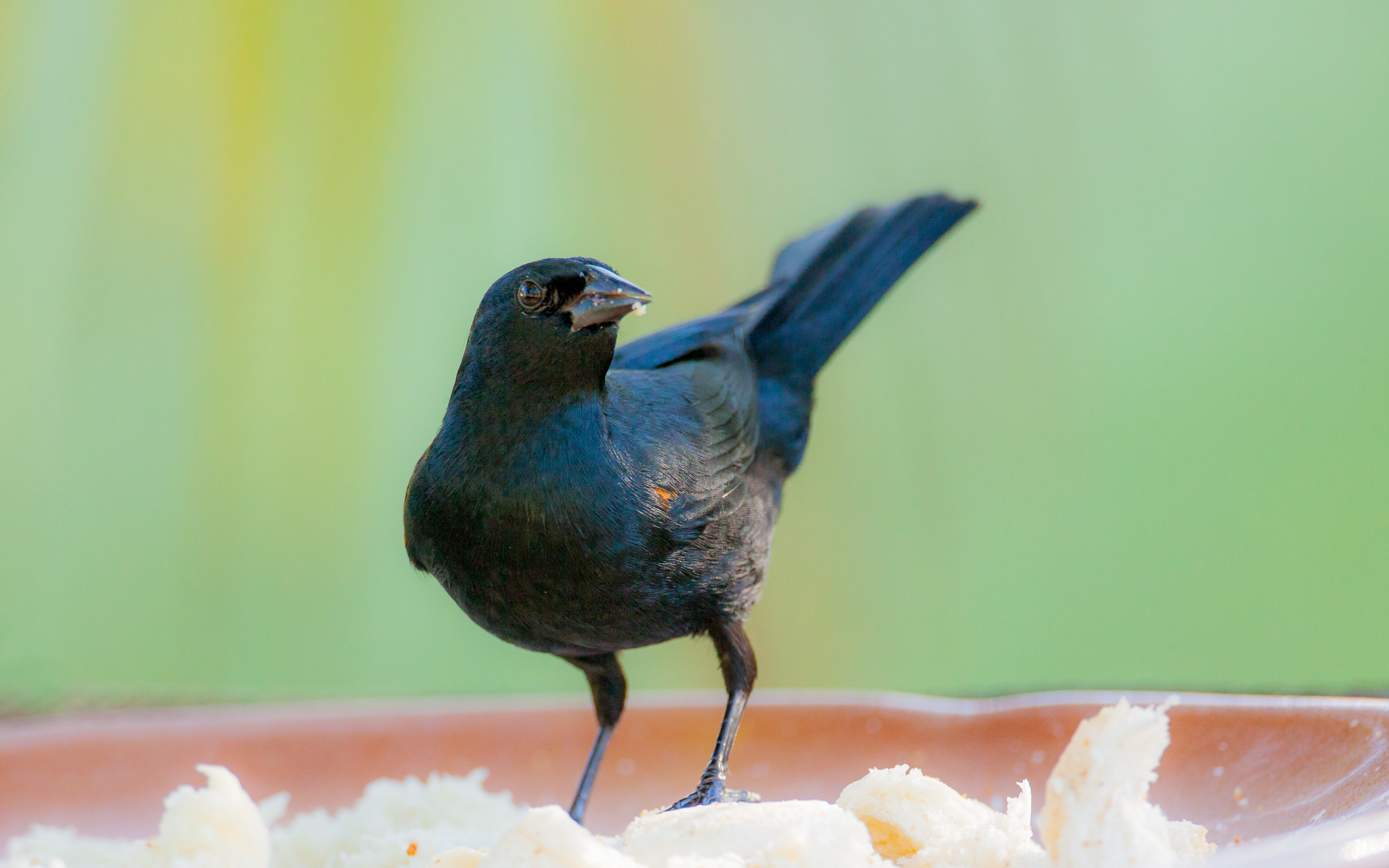
Tawny-shouldered blackbird, Agelaius humeralis

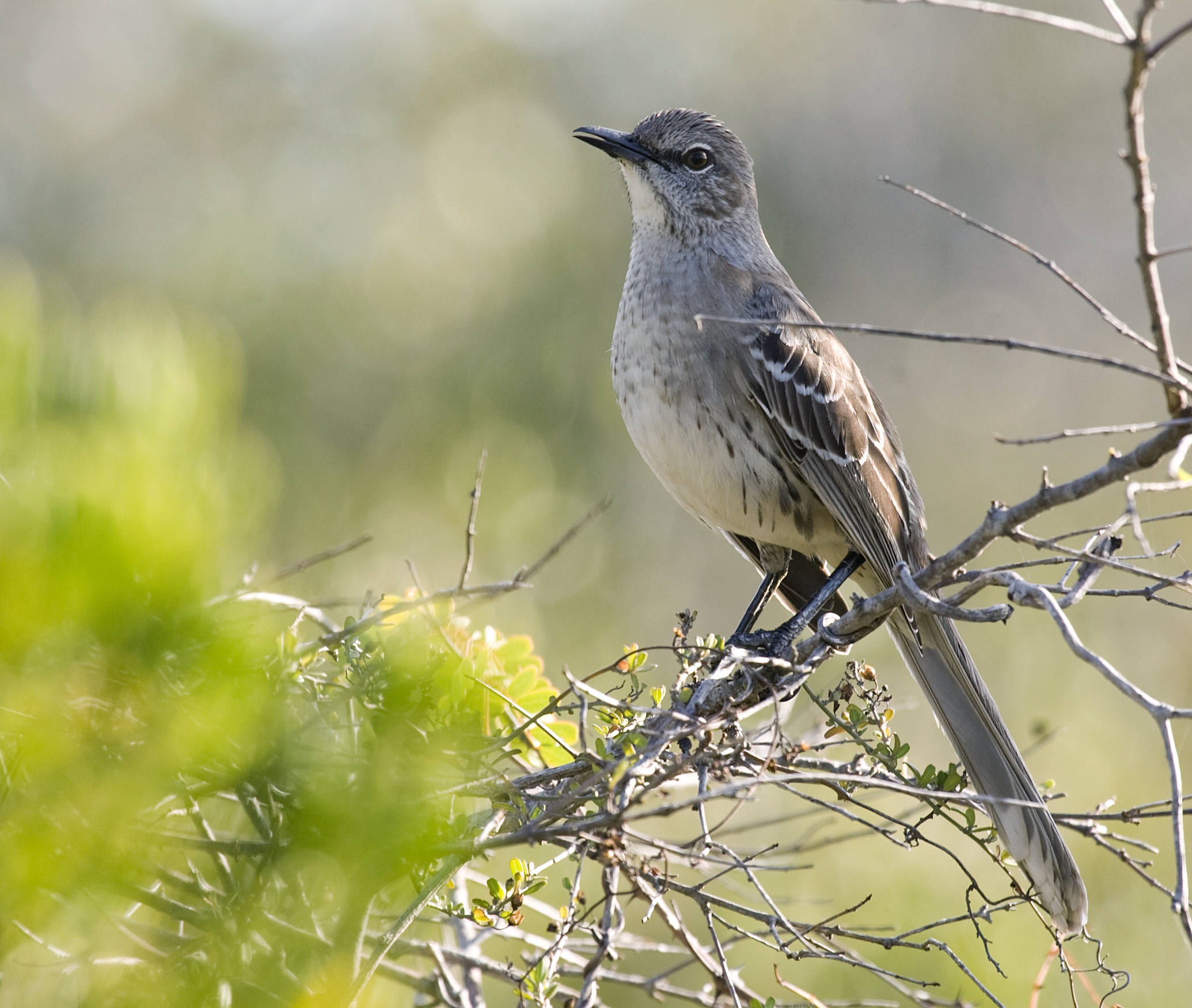
Bahama mockingbird, Mimus gundlachii

Common name	Binomial	Family	Distribution	Status	Notes
Antillean palm-swift	Tachornis phoenicobia	Apodidae	Jamaica, Cuba, and Hispaniola		
Vervain hummingbird	Mellisuga minima	Trochilidae	Hispaniola and Jamaica, occasional vagrant to Puerto Rico.		
Plain pigeon	Patagioenas inornata	Columbidae	Jamaica, Puerto Rico, Cuba, and Hispaniola.		
Tawny-shouldered blackbird	Agelaius humeralis	Icteridae	Cuba and Haiti, occasionally a vagrant to the United States.		
Greater Antillean elaenia	Elaenia fallax	Tyrannidae	Hispaniola and Jamaica.		
Stolid flycatcher	Myiarchus stolidus	Tyrannidae	Hispaniola and Jamaica.		
Palm crow	Corvus palmarum	Corvidae	Hispaniola and Cuba.		
Rufous-throated solitaire	Myadestes genibarbis	Turdidae	Dominica, Hispaniola, Jamaica, St. Vincent, St. Lucia, and Martinique, though the St. Vincent subspecies is sometimes classified as its own species.		
Bahama mockingbird	Mimus gundlachii	Mimidae	Bahamas, Jamaica, Cuba, and Turks and Caicos.		Occasional vagrant to the United States.
Greater Antillean bullfinch	Melopyrrha violacea	Thraupidae	The Bahamas, Hispaniola, Jamaica, and Turks and Caicos.		
Cuban bullfinch	Melopyrrha nigra	Thraupidae	Cuba and Grand Cayman		Grand Cayman subspecies sometimes considered a distinct species

=== Other species endemic to the Lesser Antilles ===
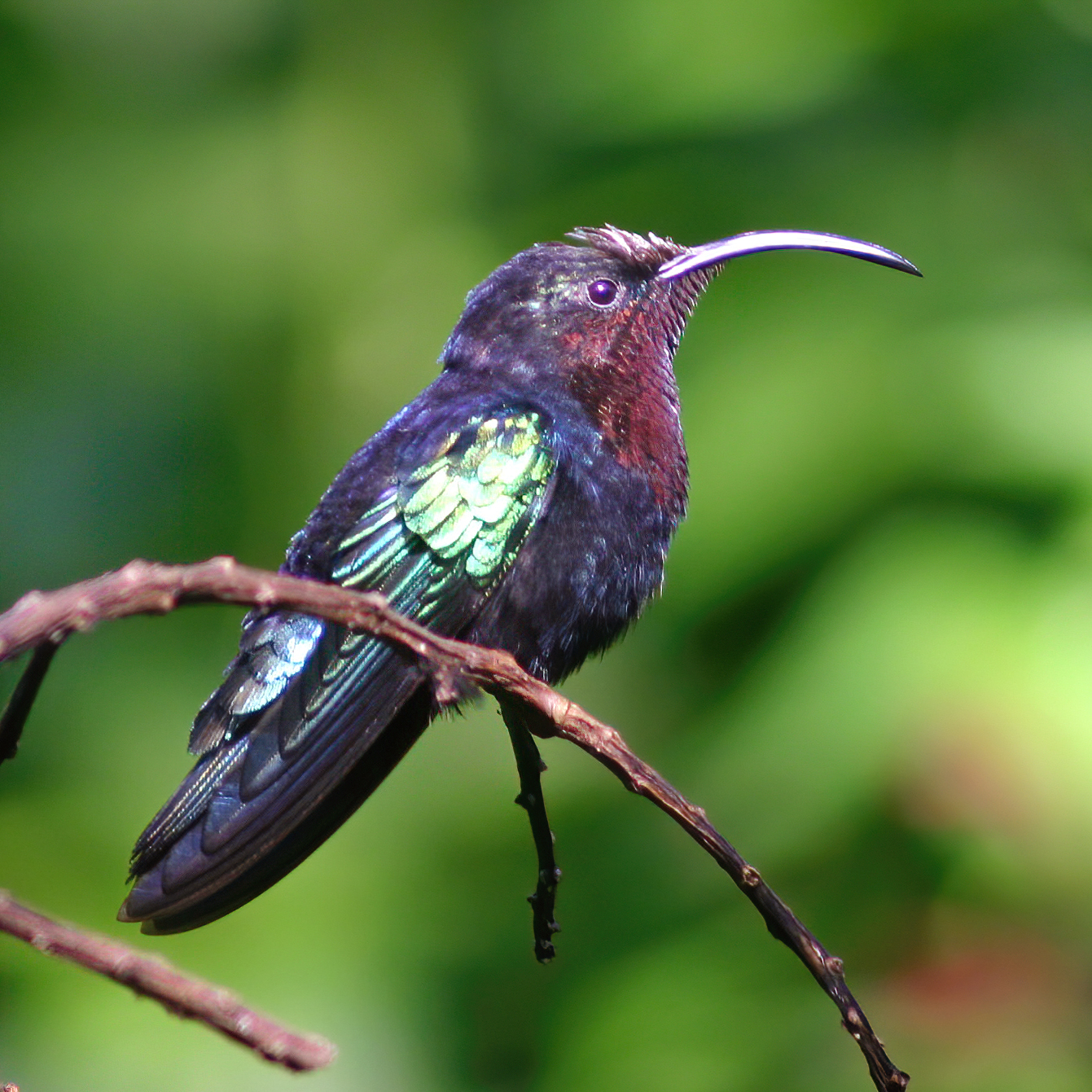
Purple-throated carib, Eulampis jugularis

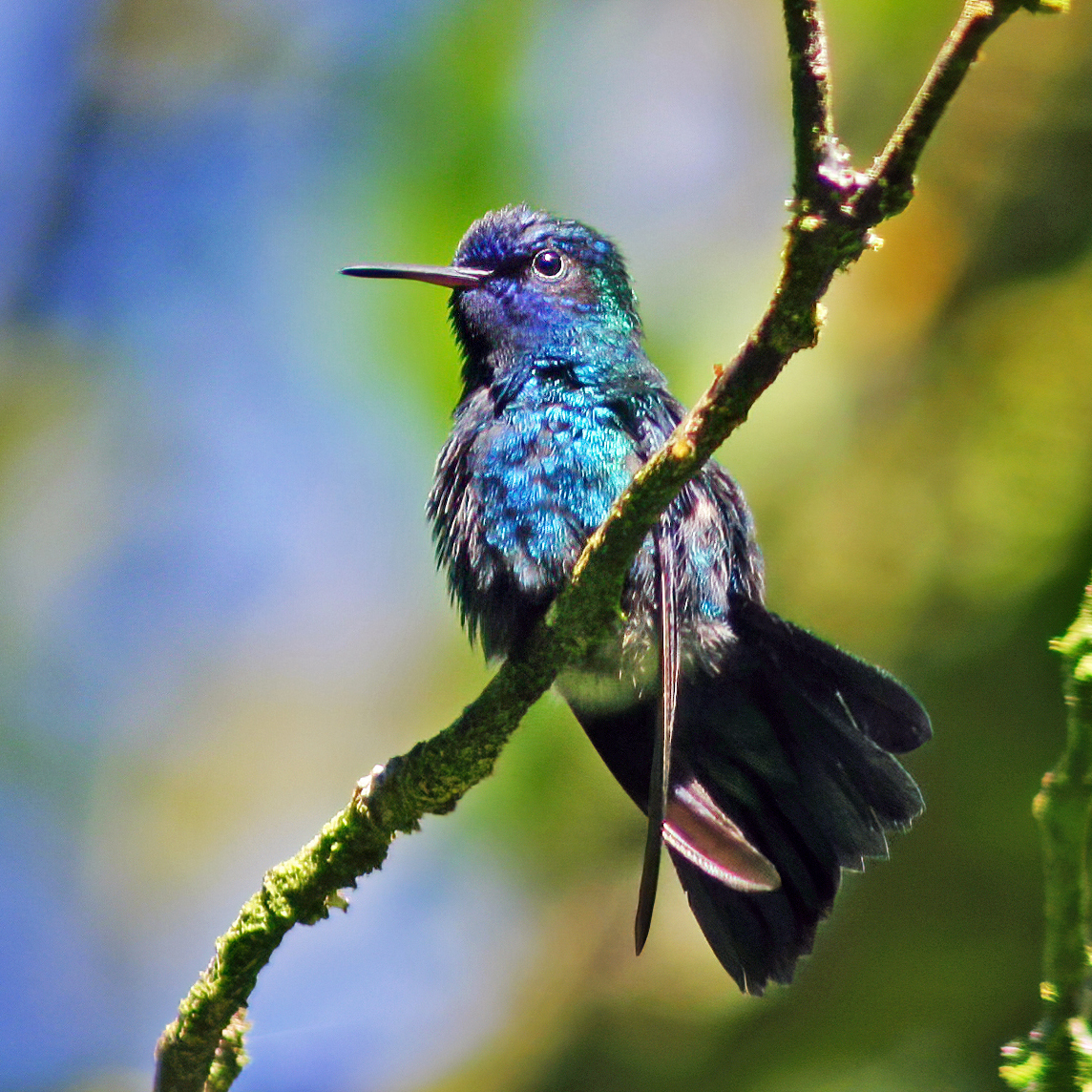
Blue-headed hummingbird, Riccordia bicolor

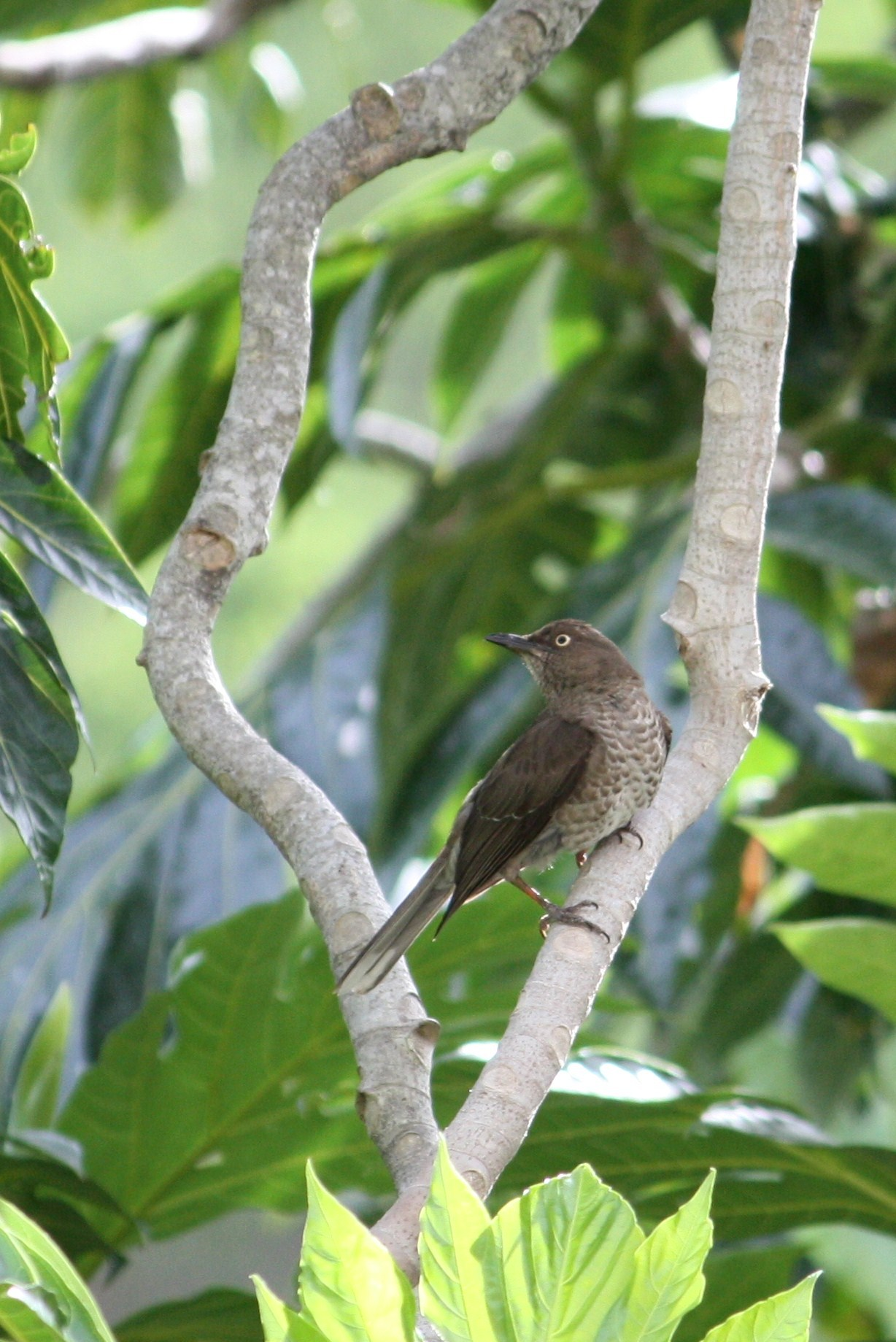
Scaly-breasted thrasher, Allenia fusca

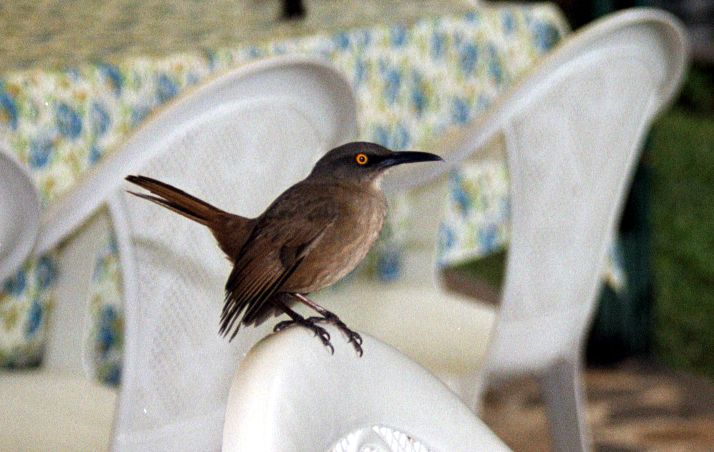
Brown trembler, Saltator albicollis

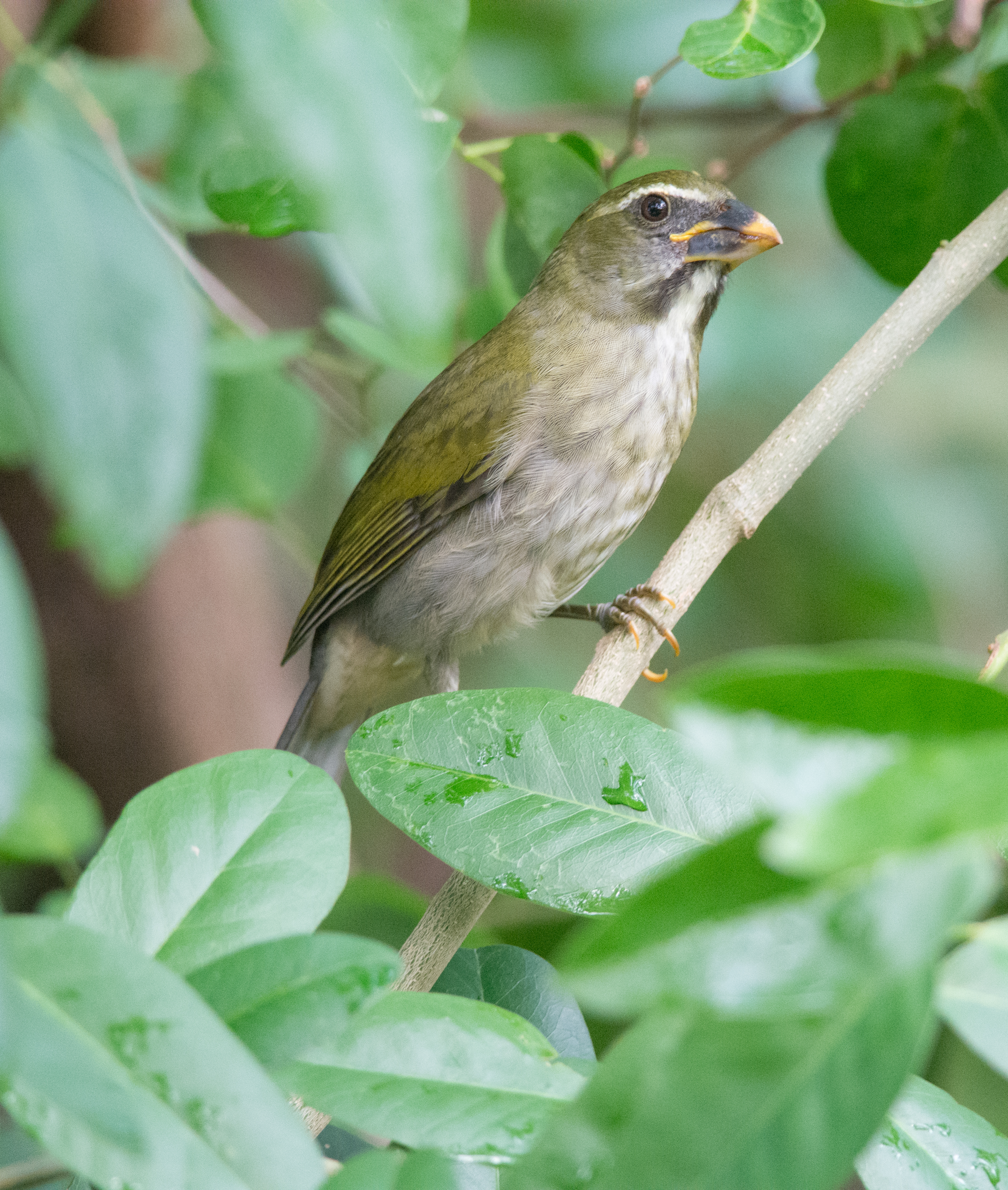
Lesser Antillean saltator, Cinclocerthia ruficauda

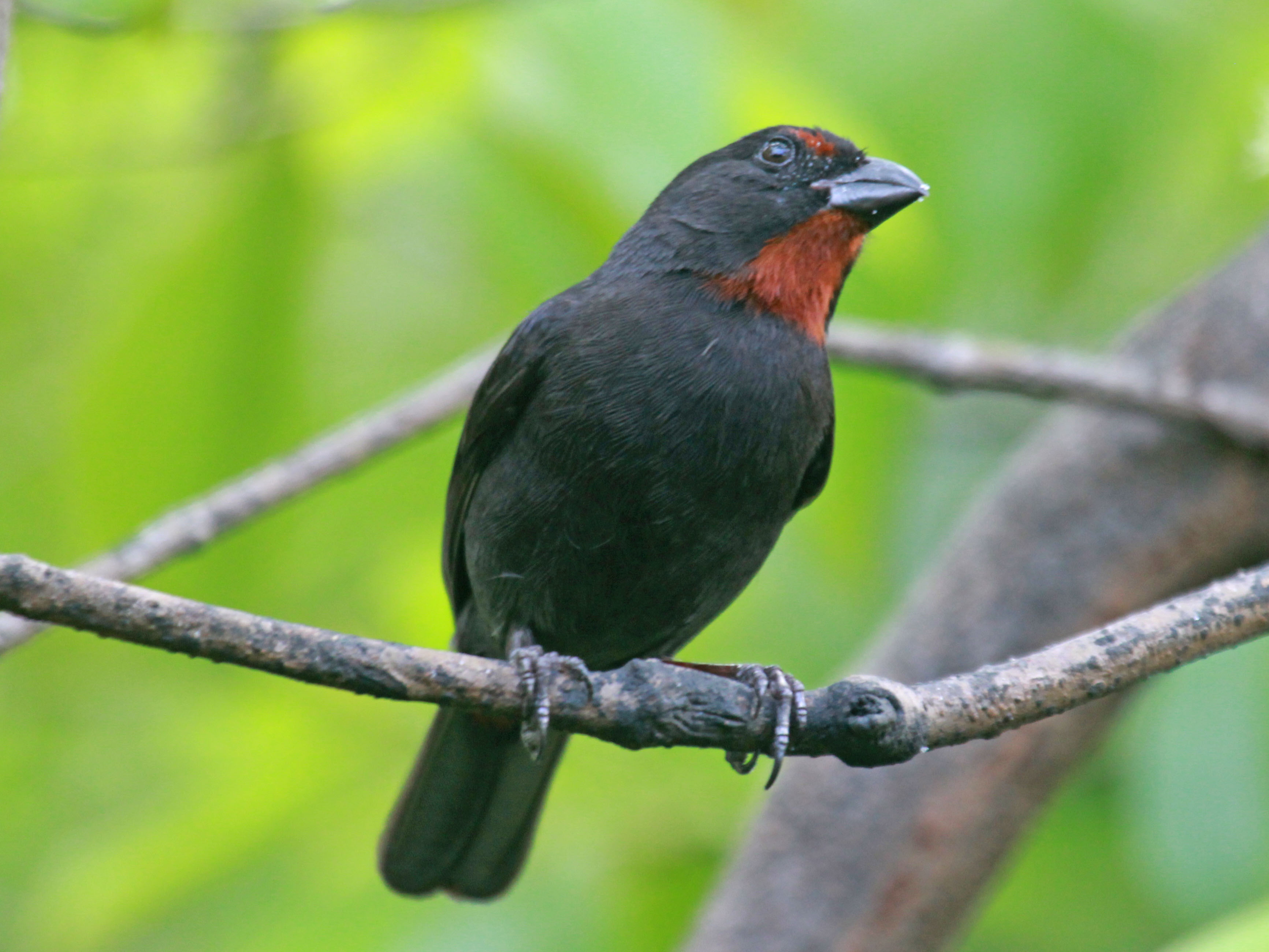
Lesser Antillean bullfinch, Loxigilla noctis

Common name	Binomial	Family	Distribution	Status	Notes
Lesser Antillean swift	Chaetura martinica	Apodidae	Dominica, Guadeloupe, Martinique, Saint Lucia and Saint Vincent.		Possible records from Nevis.
Purple-throated carib	Eulampis jugularis	Trochilidae	Antigua, Dominica, Guadeloupe, Martinique, Montserrat, Saba, Saint Kitts and Nevis, Saint Lucia, Saint Vincent and Sint Eustatius.		It has occurred as a vagrant in Barbados, Barbuda, Grenada and the Virgin Islands.
Blue-headed hummingbird	Riccordia bicolor	Trochilidae	Dominica and Martinique.		
Grenada flycatcher	Myiarchus nugator	Tyrannidae	Grenada and St. Vincent and the Grenadines.		
Lesser Antillean flycatcher	Myiarchus oberi	Tyrannidae	Barbuda, Dominica, Guadeloupe, Martinique, Saint Kitts and Nevis, and Saint Lucia.		
Forest thrush	Turdus lherminieri	Turdidae	Grenada, Dominica, Montserrat, and Saint Lucia.		The Saint Lucia population may be extinct.
White-breasted thrasher	Ramphocinclus brachyurus	Mimidae	St. Lucia and Martinique.		
Scaly-breasted thrasher	Allenia fusca	Mimidae	Antigua and Barbuda, Barbados, Dominica, Grenada, Guadeloupe, Martinique, Montserrat, Netherlands Antilles, Saint Kitts and Nevis, Saint Lucia and Saint Vincent and the Grenadines.		May be extirpated from Barbados, Barbuda, and Sint Eustatius.
Brown trembler	Cinclocerthia ruficauda	Mimidae	St. Kitts, Nevis, Montserrat, Guadeloupe, Dominica and St. Vincent.		Extirpated from Sint Eustatius.
Gray trembler	Cinclocerthia gutturalis	Mimidae	St. Lucia and Martinique.		
Plumbeous warbler	Setophaga plumbea	Parulidae	Dominica and Guadeloupe.		
Lesser Antillean tanager	Tangara cucullata	Thraupidae	St. Vincent and Grenada.		
Lesser Antillean saltator	Saltator albicollis	Thraupidae	Saint Kitts and Nevis, Dominica, Saint Lucia, and Martinique		
Lesser Antillean bullfinch	Loxigilla noctis	Thraupidae	Saint Barth, Saint Martin, Anguilla, Antigua and Barbuda, Dominica, Grenada, Guadeloupe, Martinique, Montserrat, Netherlands Antilles, Saint Kitts and Nevis, Saint Lucia, Saint Vincent and the Grenadines, the British Virgin Islands, and the U.S. Virgin Islands.		
Trinidad motmot	Momotus bahamensis	Momotidae	Trinidad and Tobago		

=== Other species endemic to the West Indies ===
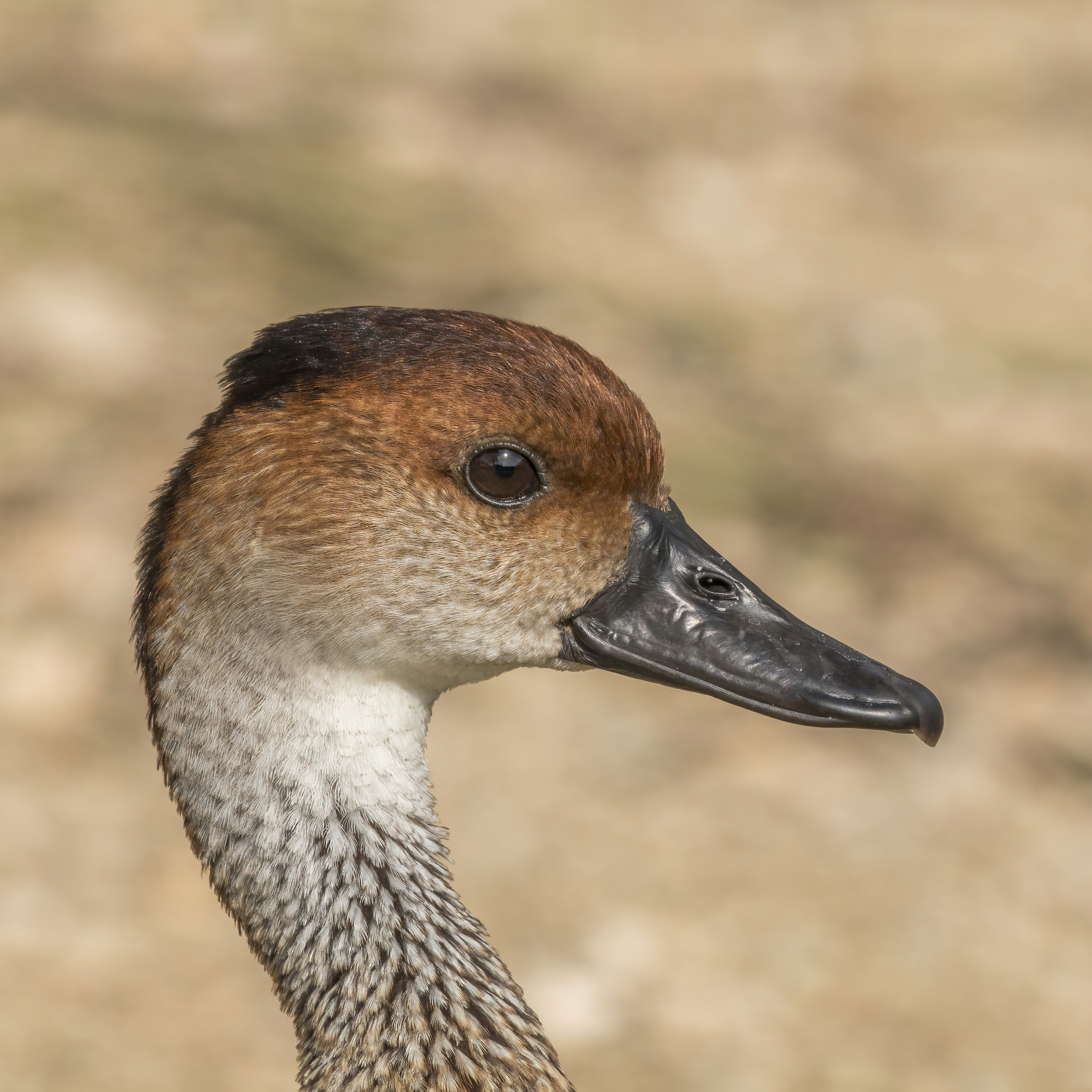
West Indian whistling duck, Dendrocygna arborea

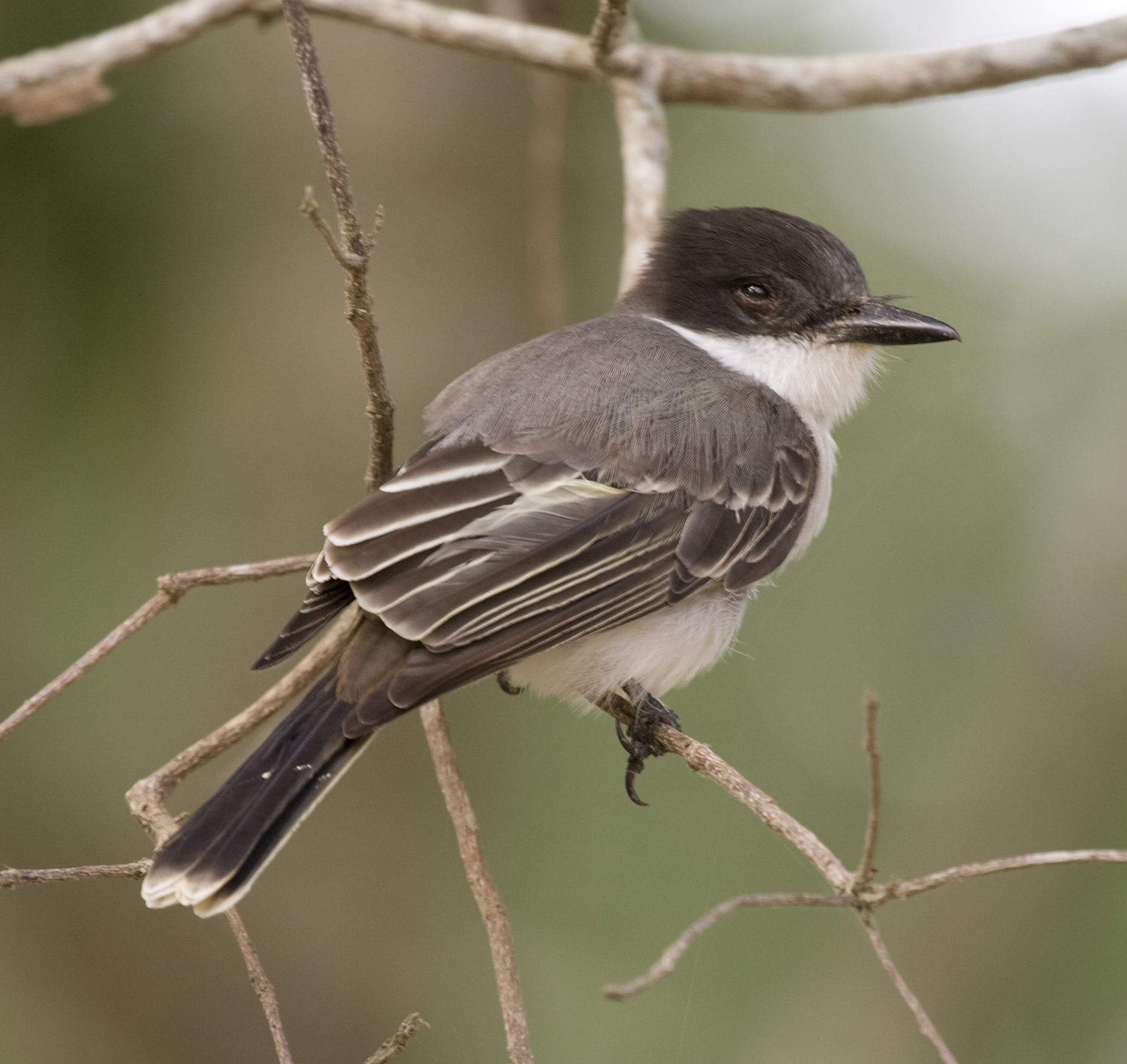
Loggerhead kingbird, Tyrannus caudifasciatus

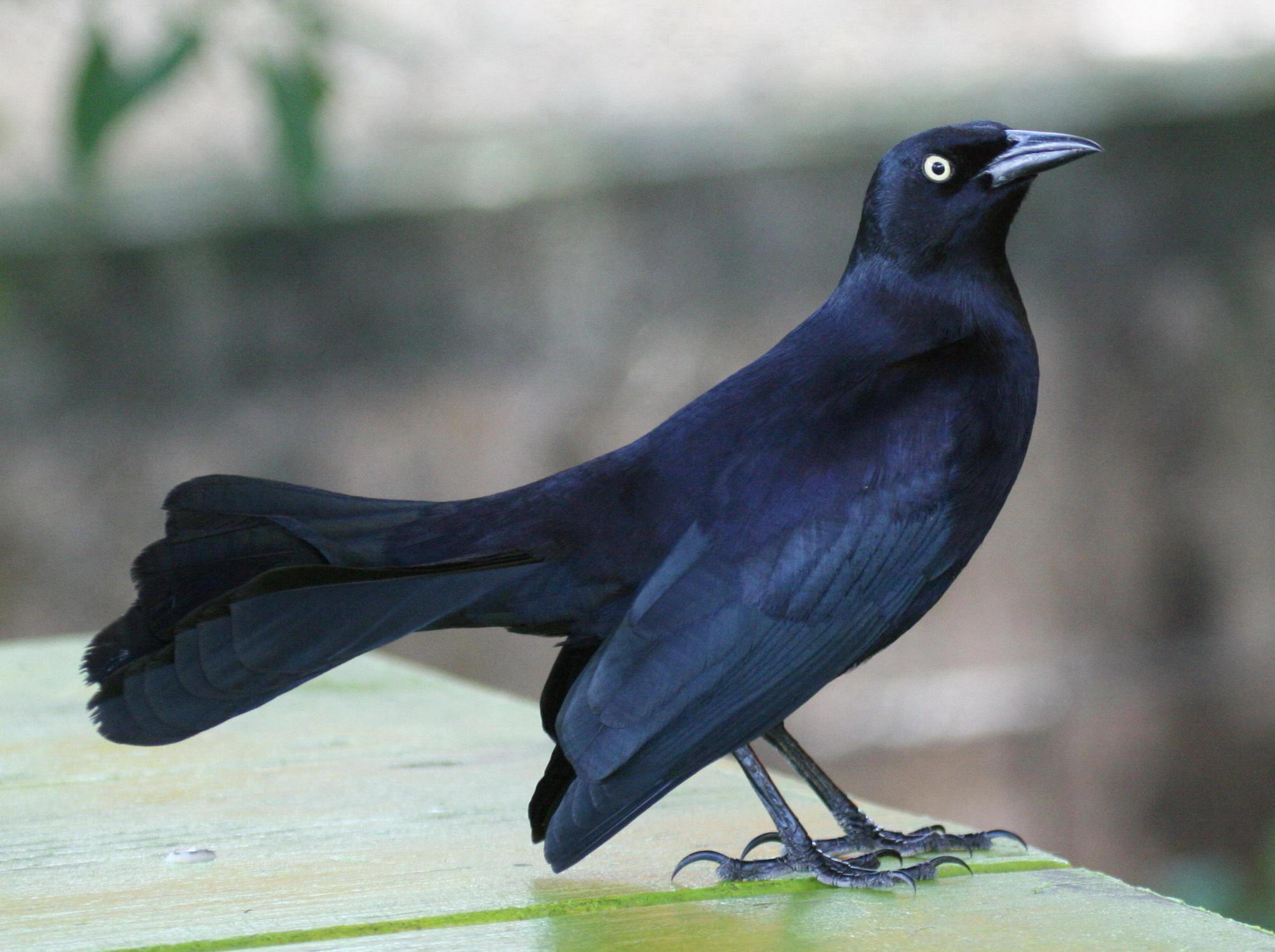
Greater Antillean grackle, Quiscalus niger

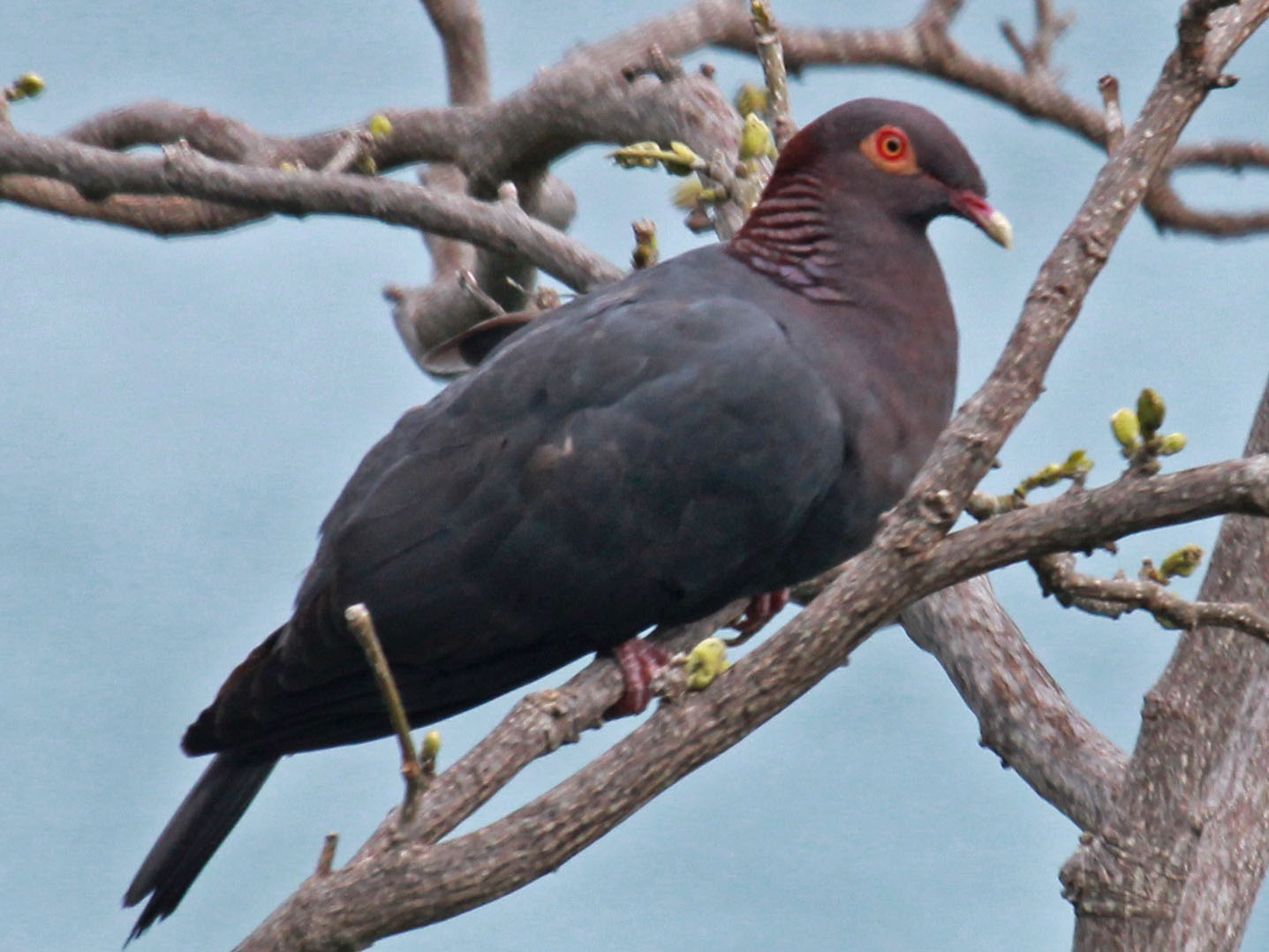
Scaly-naped pigeon, Patagioenas squamosa

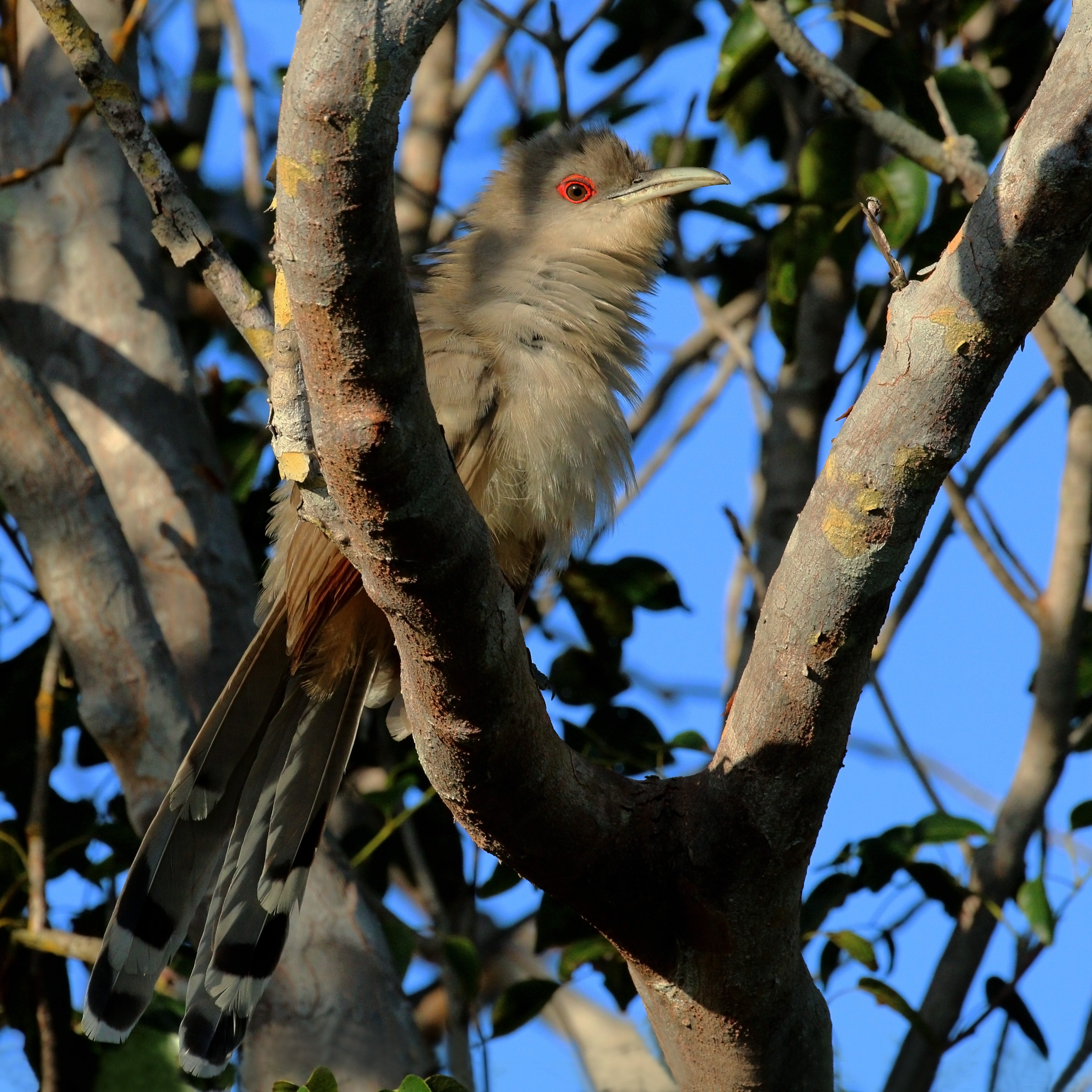
Great lizard cuckoo, Coccyzus merlini

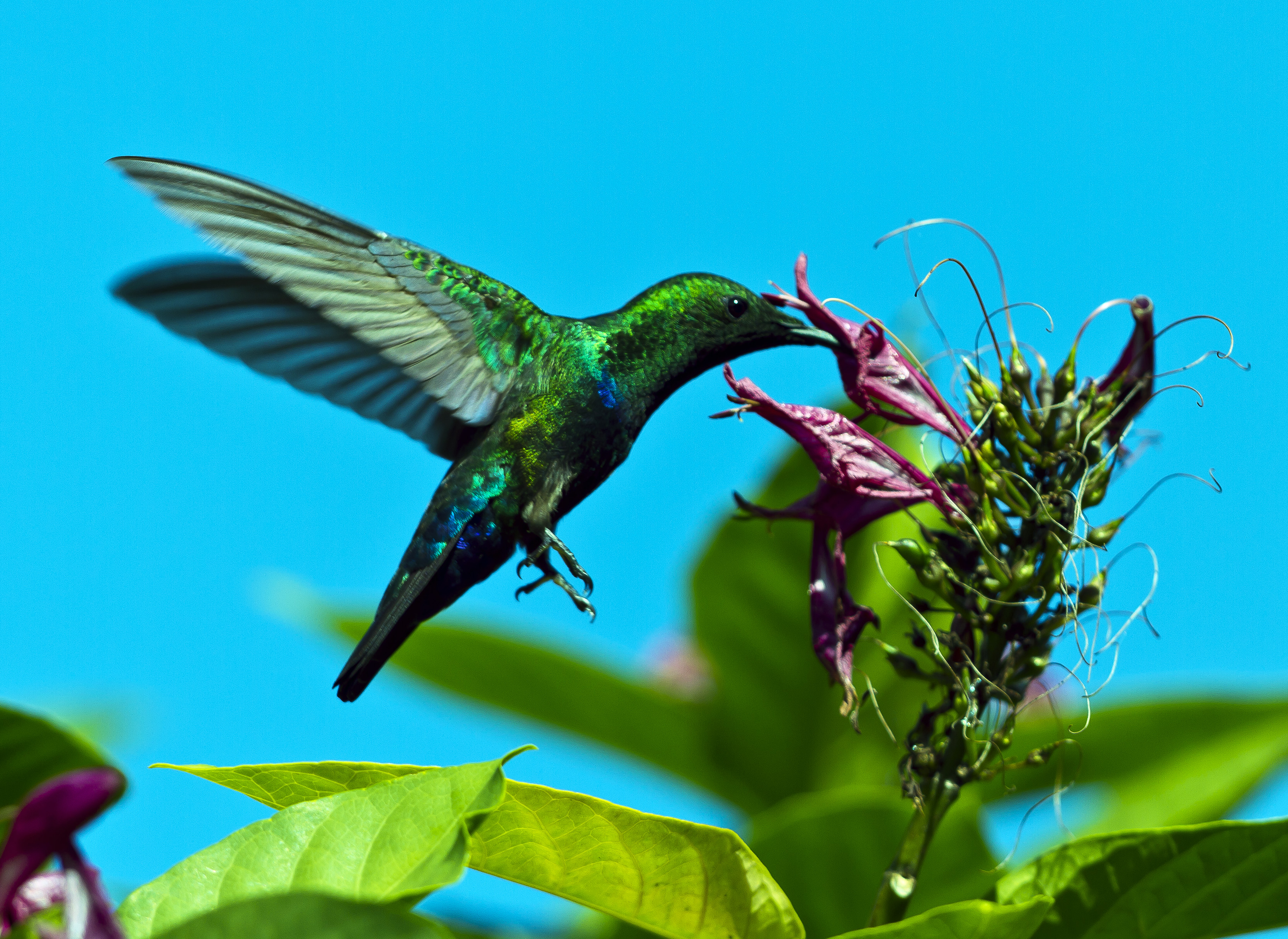
Green-throated carib, Eulampis holosericeus

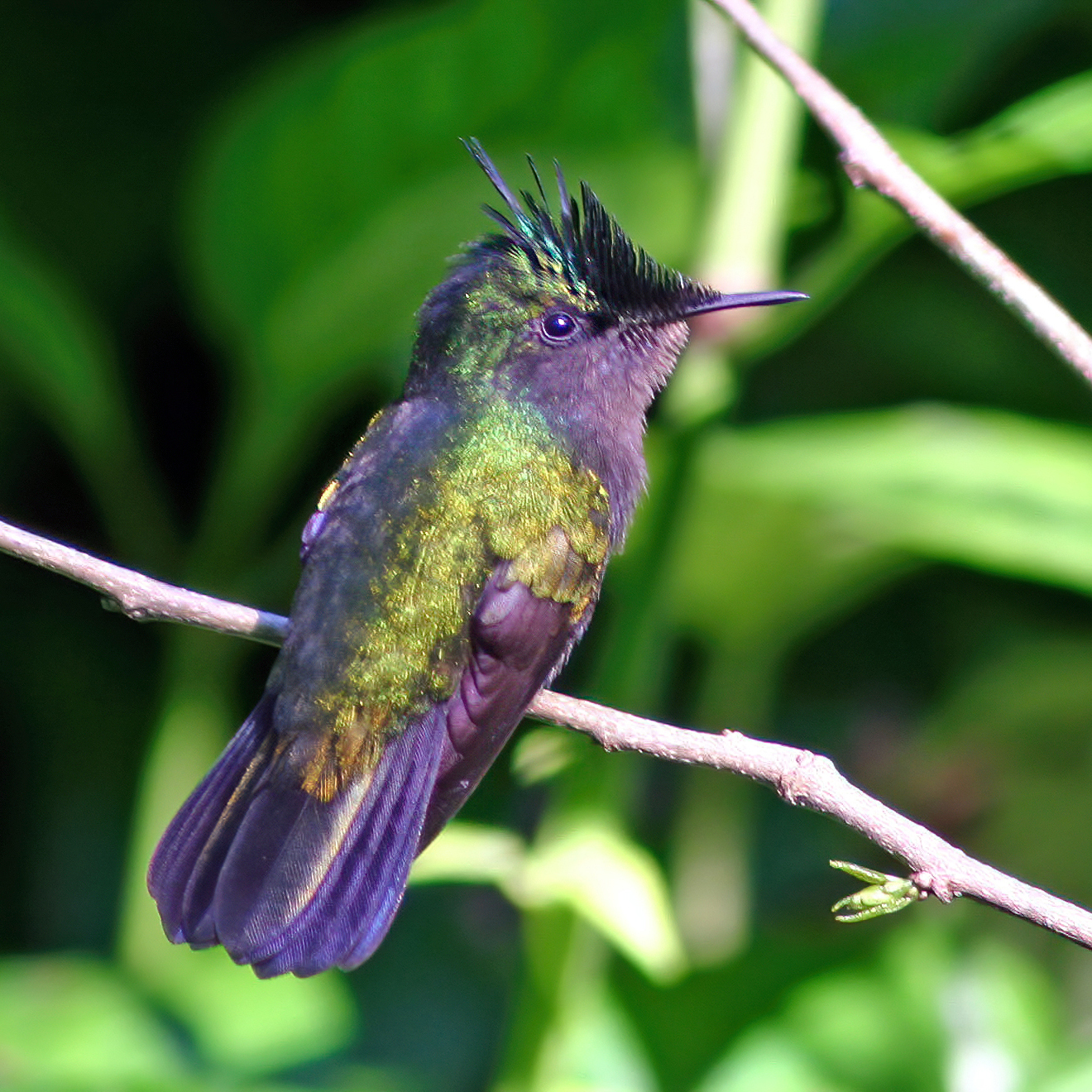
Antillean crested hummingbird, Orthorhyncus cristatus

Common name	Binomial	Family	Distribution	Status	Notes
Puerto Rican mango	Anthracothorax aurulentus	Trochilidae	the Virgin Islands and Puerto Rico.		
West Indian whistling duck	Dendrocygna arborea	Anatidae	Primarily in the Bahamas, though significant numbers exist in northern Hispaniola, Cuba, Cayman Islands, Antigua and Barbuda, and Puerto Rico.		
Loggerhead kingbird	Tyrannus caudifasciatus	Tyrannidae	Hispaniola, Jamaica, Cuba, Bahamas, Cayman Islands, and Puerto Rico		
Greater Antillean grackle	Quiscalus niger	Icteridae	Hispaniola, Cuba, Cayman Islands, Jamaica, and Puerto Rico.		
Scaly-naped pigeon	Patagioenas squamosa	Columbidae	Most of the West Indies except for Jamaica.		
Key West quail-dove	Geotrygon chrysia	Columbidae	Puerto Rico, the Bahamas, Hispaniola, and Cuba.		Formerly bred on Key West, occasional vagrant to Florida.
Caribbean martin	Progne dominicensis	Hirundinidae	Puerto Rico, Hispaniola, Cayman Islands, Jamaica, and almost all of the Lesser Antilles.		Occasional vagrant to Turks and Caicos and Cuba.
Antillean euphonia	Euphonia musica	Fringillidae	Hispaniola, Puerto Rico, and most of the Lesser Antilles.		
Lesser Antillean pewee	Contopus latirostris	Tyrannidae	Puerto Rico, Dominica, Guadeloupe, Martinique, and Saint Lucia.		Occasional records from Saint Kitts.
Western red-legged thrush	Turdus plumbeus	Turdidae	Bahamas, Cuba, and Cayman Islands.		Extirpated from Swan Islands.
Eastern red-legged thrush	Turdus ardosiaceus	Turdidae	Hispaniola, Dominica, and Puerto Rico.		
Cuban amazon	Amazona leucocephala	Psittacidae	Cuba, Bahamas, and Cayman Islands.		
West Indian woodpecker	Melanerpes superciliaris	Picidae	Cuba, Bahamas, and Cayman Islands.		
La Sagra's flycatcher	Myiarchus sagrae	Tyrannidae	Cuba, Bahamas, and Cayman Islands.		Occasional vagrant to the United States.
Great lizard cuckoo	Coccyzus merlini	Cuculidae	Cuba and the Bahamas		
Cuban emerald	Riccordia ricordii	Trochilidae	Cuba and the Bahamas		
Cuban pewee	Contopus caribaeus	Tyrannidae	Cuba and the Bahamas		
Olive-capped warbler	Setophaga pityophila	Parulidae	Cuba and the Bahamas		
Western spindalis	Spindalis zena	Spindalidae	Cozumel, Cayman Islands, Cuba, the Bahamas, and Turks and Caicos		Casual vagrant to southern Florida.
Bridled quail-dove	Geotrygon mystacea	Columbidae	The Lesser Antilles north from Saint Lucia, as well as Puerto Rico.		
Green-throated carib	Eulampis holosericeus	Trochilidae	All of the Lesser Antilles and Puerto Rico.		
Antillean crested hummingbird	Orthorhyncus cristatus	Trochilidae	All of the Lesser Antilles and Puerto Rico.		
Thick-billed vireo	Vireo crassirostris	Vireonidae	Bahamas, Turks and Caicos Islands, Cayman Islands, Tortuga Island in Haiti and Cuba.		Occasional vagrant to Florida
Vitelline warbler	Setophaga vitellina	Parulidae	Swan Islands and Grand Cayman.		

=== Extinct birds ===
Common name	Binomial	Family	Distribution	Last Sighting	Notes
Antillean cave rail	Nesotrochis debooyi	Rallidae	Occurred on Puerto Rico and U.S. Virgin Islands.	Only known from subfossil fragments.	An account from Alexander Wetmore from 1912 may refer to this bird.
Cuban macaw	Ara tricolor	Psittacidae	Occurred on Cuba.	1864, though may have lasted until the 1880s.	
Guadeloupe parakeet	Psittacara labati	Psittacidae	Occurred on Guadeloupe.	Presumed to have disappeared in the late 1700s.	Since no physical evidence has been discovered, the existence of this species has been brought into question.
Martinique amazon	Amazona martinicana	Psittacidae	Occurred on Martinique.	1722	Since no physical evidence has been discovered, the existence of this species has been brought into question.
Guadeloupe amazon	Amazona violacea	Psittacidae	Occurred on Guadeloupe.	1779	Since no physical evidence has been discovered, the existence of this species has been brought into question.
Puerto Rican barn owl	Tyto cavatica	Tytonidae	Occurred in Puerto Rico	Prehistoric.	May have existed until 1912.
Andros Island barn owl	Tyto pollens	Tytonidae	Occurred in the Bahamas.	May have existed into the 16th century.	
Cuban pauraque	Siphonorhis daiquiri	Caprimulgidae	Occurred in Cuba.	Prehistoric.	May still survive based on the fact that nightjars are notoriously hard to study.
Brace's emerald	Riccordia bracei	Trochilidae	Occurred in the Bahamas, on the island of New Providence.	Only known from a specimen collected in 1879.	
Gould's emerald	Riccordia elegans	Trochilidae	Most likely Jamaica or the Bahamas.	Only known from the type specimen, taken in 1860.	
St. Kitts bullfinch	Melopyrrha grandis	Thraupidae	Occurred on Saint Kitts.	Last reliably seen in 1929.	May still survive; potential sightings have been made since the 1990s.
Grand Cayman thrush	Turdus ravidus	Turdidae	Occurred on Grand Cayman	Last reliably seen in 1938.	

=== Near-endemics ===
- Zenaida dove
- Antillean nighthawk
- White-crowned pigeon
- Pearly-eyed thrasher
- Caribbean dove

The following is a list of species endemic to the region as breeding species:

The following is a list of species endemic to the region as non-breeding species:

- Kirtland's warbler

The following restricted-range species are also found in the region:

The following seabirds are restricted to the region as breeders:

- Black-capped petrel
