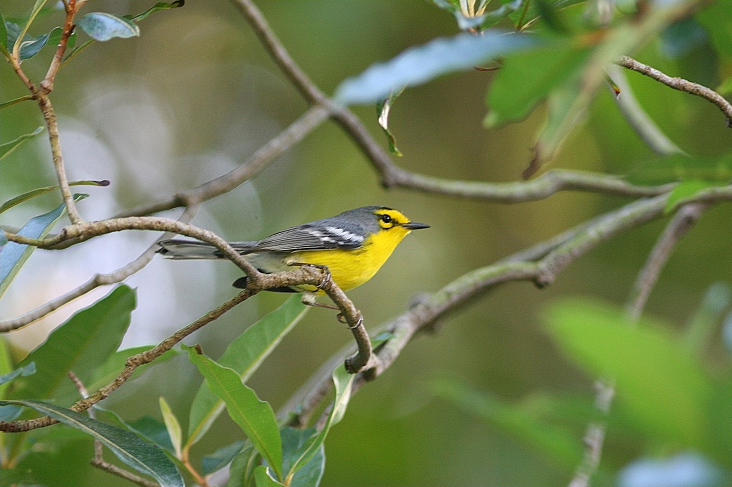

Conservation status
- Least Concern (IUCN 3.1)

Scientific classification
- Kingdom: Animalia
- Phylum: Chordata
- Class: Aves
- Order: Passeriformes
- Family: Parulidae
- Genus: Setophaga
- Species: S. delicata

Binomial name
- Setophaga delicata (Ridgway, 1883)

Synonyms
- See text

= Saint Lucia warbler =

Species of bird

The St. Lucia warbler (Note: The IOC, AviList, and the Clements taxonomy use the abbreviation "St." in the name; IOC is the Wikipedia standard for the English names of birds.) (Setophaga delicata) is a species of passerine in the family Parulidae, the New World warblers. It is endemic to Saint Lucia.

== Taxonomy and systematics ==
The St. Lucia warbler was formally described by the American ornithologist Robert Ridgway in 1883 as a subspecies of Adelaide's warbler, Dendroeca [sic] adelaidae delicata. Its type locality was given as "Sta. Lucia". What are now the St. Lucia warbler and the Barbuda warbler (Setophaga subita) were long treated as subspecies of Adelaide's warbler. Several late twentieth century studies detailed genetic, plumage, morphological, and vocal differences among the three. Taxonomic systems began separating them in 2000. Beginning in 2011 taxonomic systems merged genus Dendroica into its present genus Setophaga. The three species formerly known as Adelaide's warbler are included in the "yellow-throated" (S. dominica) species group within Setophaga.

The St. Lucia warbler is monotypic.

== Etymology ==
The genus Setophaga is Greek for "moth eater". The specific epithet delicata is Latin and means "dainty", "nice", or "delicate".

== Description ==
The St. Lucia warbler is 12.5 cm (4.9 in) long. Adult males have a slate- to plumbeous gray forehead and crown with a thin black streak below them, a wide rich lemon yellow supercilium to behind the eye, a yellow arc below the eye, and slate- to plumbeous gray ear coverts with a black line under and behind them. Their upperparts are slate- to plumbeous gray. Their wings are mostly black or dusky with slate-gray edges on the flight feathers and large white tips on the median and greater coverts that show as two wing bars. Their tail is black or dusky with gray feather edges and progressively more white at the end from the fourth to the outermost feathers. Their cheeks, chin, throat, breast, and belly are rich lemon yellow with an olive tinge on the sides and flanks; their undertail coverts are white. Adult females are paler gray above and much paler yellow below than males. Their black under-crown stripe and wing bars are narrower. Both sexes have a black iris, a dusky brown bill, and light grayish brown legs and feet.

== Distribution and habitat ==
The St. Lucia warbler is found on the island of Saint Lucia in the Lesser Antilles. It inhabits almost all of the available landscapes, shunning only the driest scrub forest. It is found in both primary and secondary deciduous, semi-deciduous, and humid evergreen forests. Though it does not give numbers, a field guide says it is a bird of mid- to high-elevation forests.

There are also three twentieth century records from the island of Martinique, which is just north of Saint Lucia.

== Behavior ==
=== Movement ===
The St. Lucia warbler is a year-round resident.

=== Feeding ===
The St. Lucia warbler feeds primarily on insects and includes smaller numbers of other arthropods including spiders in its diet. It occasionally feeds on fruit. Though it favors the forest understory up to about 8 m (25 ft) it will forage in the canopy as high as 28 m (90 ft). "They use 'flycatching', 'leaf-snatching', and 'leaf-gleaning' techniques in roughly equal proportions."

=== Breeding ===
The St. Lucia warbler usually breeds between March and June. Its nest is a small cup made from grass lined with feathers. It is typically well hidden in vegetation; most are about 1 to 3 m (3 to 10 ft) above the ground but nests have been found as high as 6 m (20 ft). The clutch is two to four eggs that are white with reddish brown spots. The incubation period, time to fledging, and details of parental care are not known.

=== Vocalization ===
The St. Lucia warbler's song is "a lengthy trill, sung in couplet notes, often rising or descending in tone towards the end" and is highly variable. Its call is "a medium-strength chick".

== Status ==
The IUCN has assessed the St. Lucia warbler as being of Least Concern. It has a small range; its population size is not known but is believed to be stable. No immediate threats have been identified. It is considered common throughout the island. "In modern times, the greatest threat to populations is the conversion of forest to tourist developments and associated urbanization."
