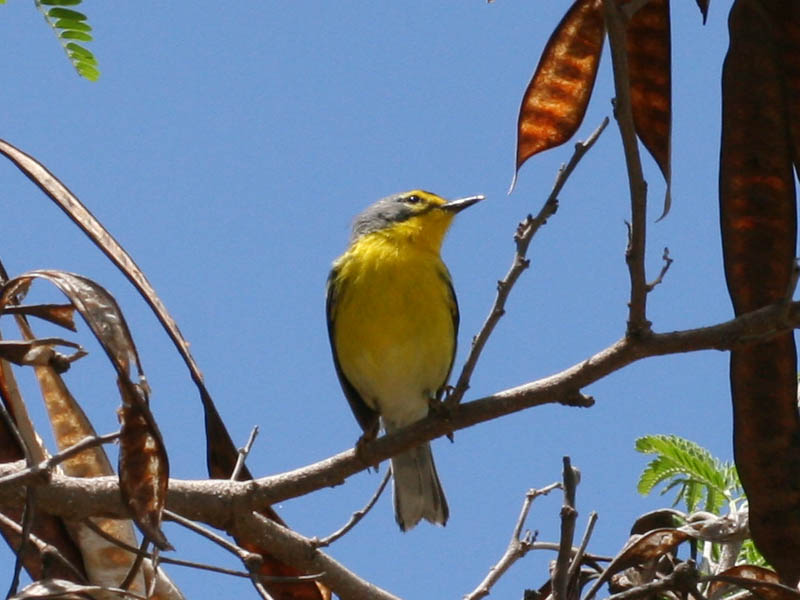

Conservation status
- Least Concern (IUCN 3.1)

Scientific classification
- Kingdom: Animalia
- Phylum: Chordata
- Class: Aves
- Order: Passeriformes
- Family: Parulidae
- Genus: Setophaga
- Species: S. adelaidae

Binomial name
- Setophaga adelaidae (Baird, 1865)

Synonyms
- Dendroica adelaidae Baird, 1865

= Adelaide's warbler =

Species of bird

Adelaide's warbler (Setophaga adelaidae), or reinita mariposera in Puerto Rican Spanish, is a species of bird in the family Parulidae, the New World warblers. It is endemic to the archipelago of Puerto Rico.

== Taxonomy and systematics ==
Adelaide's warbler was formally described in 1865 as Dendroica adelaidae. What are now the Barbuda warbler (Setophaga subita) and St. Lucia warbler (S. delicata) were long treated as subspecies of it. Several late twentieth century studies detailed genetic, plumage, morphological, and vocal differences among the three. Taxonomic systems began separating them in 2000. Beginning in 2011 taxonomic systems merged genus Dendroica into its present genus Setophaga.

Adelaide's warbler is named after Maria Antoinette Adelaide Florentia del Carmen Swift (1829–1884), daughter of Robert E. G. Swift, who collected the first specimen.

== Description ==
Adelaide's warbler is 12.5 cm (4.9 in) long. Adult males have a slate-gray crown with a thin black stripe below it, a wide yellow supercilium that becomes thin and white behind the eye, a thin gray line through the eye, a white arc below the eye, gray ear coverts. Their upperparts are slate-gray. Their wings are mostly dull black or dusky with slate-gray edges on the flight feathers and white tips on the greater and median upperwing coverts that show as two wing bars. Their tail is dull black or dusky with white ends on the inner webs of the outer three pairs of tail feathers. Their underparts from the chin through the breast are lemon-yellow, their belly a paler yellow, and their undertail coverts white. Females are slightly duller than males with a thinner black line below the crown and less white on the tail feathers. Both sexes have a dark brown iris, a blackish bill, and legs and feet variously described as dark grayish pink, light grayish brown, and pale yellowish. Juveniles have no black on their head. Their head and upperparts are brownish gray with a strong brown wash on the back. Their supercilium is much narrower than adults' and their underparts are paler yellow. Their wings and tail feathers have brownish or olive-gray edges.

== Distribution and habitat ==
Adelaide's warbler is found the main island of Puerto Rico, though not at the extreme eastern end, and in the island municipality of Vieques. The species occurs more commonly in dry forests in the south, such as Guánica State Forest. It also occurs in the Northern Karst Belt, in flatter areas of the Cordillera Central, and in secondary forest, shade coffee plantations and citrus orchards throughout the island. On Vieques it is found in dry forest on limestone and dry scrublands.

== Behavior ==
=== Movement ===
Adelaide's warbler is a year-round resident.

=== Feeding ===
Adelaide's warbler feeds on a wide variety of insects and other arthropods. It takes at least half of its prey by gleaning from leaves but also takes it from other substrates, during brief hovers, and in mid-air. It feeds from ground level to at least 10 m (33 ft) above it. In some areas it regularly joins mixed-species feeding flocks which can include Puerto Rican todies, vireos and other New World warblers.

=== Breeding ===
The breeding season of Adelaide's warbler is concentrated between March and June though in response to rains it may begin as early as January and continue into July. The species' nest is a cup woven from grass and lined with finer grass, feathers, and hair; they sometimes have moss on the outside. They are typically well hidden in dense vegetation though some are more in the open in cacti. Nests have been found up to about 6 m (20 ft) above the ground. The clutch size is two to four eggs that are white to greenish white with brown flecks and spots. The female alone incubates, for about 15 days. Both parents brood and provision nestlings. Fledging occurs about 10 days after hatch. A small percentage of nests are parasitized by the shiny cowbird (Molothrus bonariensis).

=== Vocalization ===
Adelaide's warblers sing a "loud trill variable in pitch and speed". Individuals may have more than 20 variations. The species' calls include a quiet high-pitched pip, bursts of a loud harsh chit, and a chip.

== Status ==
The IUCN has assessed Adelaide's warbler as being of Least Concern. It has a small range; its population size is not known but is believed to be stable. No immediate threats have been identified. It is considered common in the western part of the main island and less so in the east.

== See also ==
- Fauna of Puerto Rico
- List of birds of Puerto Rico
- List of endemic fauna of Puerto Rico
- List of birds of Vieques
- El Toro Wilderness
