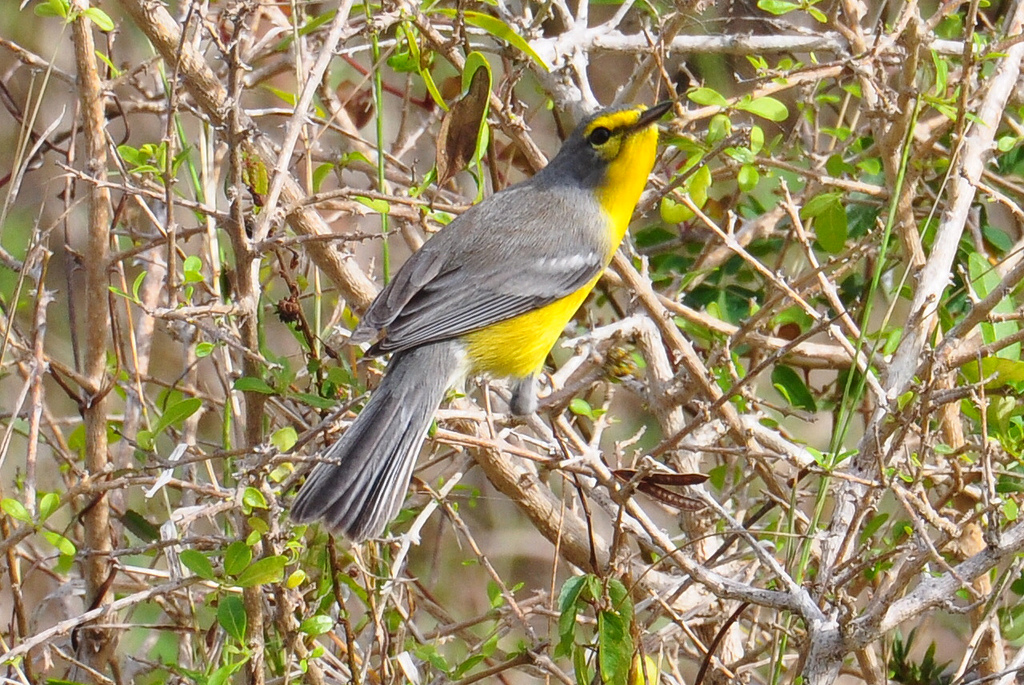

Conservation status
- Vulnerable (IUCN 3.1)

Scientific classification
- Kingdom: Animalia
- Phylum: Chordata
- Class: Aves
- Order: Passeriformes
- Family: Parulidae
- Genus: Setophaga
- Species: S. subita

Binomial name
- Setophaga subita (Riley, 1904)

Synonyms
- Setophaga adelaidae subita; Dendroica adelaidae subita; Dendroica subita

= Barbuda warbler =

Species of bird

The Barbuda warbler (Setophaga subita) is a Vulnerable species of bird in the family Parulidae, the New World warblers. It is endemic to the island of Barbuda in Antigua and Barbuda.

== Taxonomy and systematics ==
The Barbuda warbler was formally described in 1904 as Dendrica subita. What are now the Barbuda warbler and St. Lucia warbler (Setophaga delicata) were long treated as subspecies of Adelaide's warbler (S. adelaidae). Several late twentieth century studies detailed genetic, plumage, morphological, and vocal differences among the three. Taxonomic systems began separating them in 2000. Beginning in 2011 taxonomic systems merged genus Dendroica into its present genus Setophaga.

The Barbuda warbler is monotypic.

== Description ==
The Barbuda warbler is 12 to 13.5 cm (4.7 to 5.3 in) long and weighs 5.3 to 8 g (0.19 to 0.28 oz). The sexes have the same plumage. Adults have a slightly yellow forehead, a mouse gray crown, dark lores, a wide yellow supercilium to just behind the eye, a yellow arc below the eye, and mouse gray ear coverts. Their back is light gray with a brownish tinge and their rump and uppertail coverts are mouse gray. Their wings are mostly black with thin gray edges on the flight feathers and gray tips on the greater coverts that show as a dusky wing bar. Their tail is black. The outermost three feathers have thin white edges and a large white spot near the end. Their cheeks, chin, throat, and breast are lemon yellow and their belly and undertail coverts white. Both sexes have a dark iris, a blackish bill, and dark grayish pink legs and feet.

== Distribution and habitat ==
The Barbuda warbler is found only on the island of Barbuda in the small Lesser Antillean country of Antigua and Barbuda. It primarily inhabits dry scrublands and dry forest, and in lesser numbers mangroves and coastal brushlands.

== Behavior ==
=== Movement ===
The Barbuda warbler is a year-round resident.

=== Feeding ===
The Barbuda warbler's diet has not been studied but most observations of feeding show that it feeds on small invertebrates.

=== Breeding ===
Nothing is known about the Barbuda warbler's breeding biology.

=== Vocalization ===
As of July 2026 xeno-canto had a single recording of a Barbuda warbler song; the Cornell Lab's Macaulay Library had many. However, no description of the species' vocalizations was available at that time.

== Status ==
The IUCN originally in 2002 assessed the Barbuda warbler as Near Threatened and since 2020 as Vulnerable. It has a very small range and its estimated population of between 600 and 1700 mature individuals is believed to be decreasing. "Although most current development is confined to the Codrington area, proposed unplanned housing development and poor land-use practices (e.g. land clearance for agriculture, garbage dumping, and unmanaged livestock) may be increasing threats. Natural habitats on the island are already much altered by free-ranging grazing Codrington, Antigua and Barbuda." In 2017 Hurricane Irma caused massive damage across the island. Despite fears, it apparently did not have a severe impact on the species' population size. "Most of the [island's] vegetation has been degraded through browsing and grazing by feral mammals, but this has been the case for over a hundred years and there is no indication of measurable effects on Barbuda Warblers."
