= List of birds of Hispaniola =

This is a list of the bird species recorded in Hispaniola. The avifauna of Hispaniola included a total of 327 species, according to Bird Checklists of the World as of November 2024. Of them, 14 have been introduced by humans and 111 are rare or accidental. One species is endemic to the Dominican Republic, one is endemic to Haiti, and 28 more are endemic to the island as a whole. There are also separate lists for the two nations comprising Hispaniola: List of birds of the Dominican Republic and List of birds of Haiti.

This list is presented in the taxonomic sequence of the Check-list of North and Middle American Birds, 7th edition through the 63rd Supplement, published by the American Ornithological Society (AOS). Common and scientific names are also those of the Check-list, except that the common names of families are from the Clements taxonomy because the AOS list does not include them.

The following tags have been used to highlight several categories of occurrence.

- (A) Accidental - a species that rarely or accidentally occurs in Hispaniola
- (E-DR) Endemic-DR - a species endemic only to the Dominican Republic
- (E-Haiti) Endemic-Haiti - a species endemic only to Haiti
- (E) Endemic - a species endemic to Hispaniola and found in both the Dominican Republic and Haiti
- (Ex) Extirpated: a species that is no longer found in the island
- (I) Introduced - a species introduced directly to Hispaniola or elsewhere in the New World

== Ducks, geese, and waterfowl ==
Order: Anseriformes Family: Anatidae

Anatidae includes the ducks and most duck-like waterfowl, such as geese and swans. These birds are adapted to an aquatic existence with webbed feet, flattened bills, and feathers that are excellent at shedding water due to an oily coating.

- White-faced whistling-duck, Dendrocygna viduata (A)
- Black-bellied whistling-duck, Dendrocygna autumnalis (A)
- West Indian whistling-duck, Dendrocygna arborea
- Fulvous whistling-duck, Dendrocygna bicolor
- Snow goose, Anser caerulescens (A?)
- Canada goose, Branta canadensis (A)
- Orinoco goose, Neochen jubata (A)
- Muscovy duck, Cairina moschata (I)
- Wood duck, Aix sponsa (A)
- Blue-winged teal, Spatula discors
- Northern shoveler, Spatula clypeata
- Gadwall, Mareca strepera (A)
- Eurasian wigeon, Mareca penelope (A)
- American wigeon, Mareca americana
- Mallard, Anas platyrhynchos (A)
- White-cheeked pintail, Anas bahamensis
- Northern pintail, Anas acuta
- Green-winged teal, Anas crecca
- Canvasback, Aythya valisineria (A)
- Redhead, Aythya americana (A)
- Ring-necked duck, Aythya collaris
- Greater scaup, Aythya marila (A)
- Lesser scaup, Aythya affinis
- Hooded merganser, Lophodytes cucullatus (A)
- Red-breasted merganser, Mergus serrator (A)
- Masked duck, Nomonyx dominicus
- Ruddy duck, Oxyura jamaicensis

== Chachalacas, curassows, guans ==
Order: Galliformes Family: Cracidae

The Cracidae are large birds, similar in general appearance to turkeys. The guans and curassows live in trees, but the smaller chachalacas are found in more open scrubby habitats. They are generally dull-plumaged, but the curassows and some guans have colorful facial ornaments.

- Great curassow, Crax rubra (I) (Ex)
- Black curassow, Crax alector (I) (Ex)

== Guineafowl ==
Order: Galliformes Family: Numididae

Guineafowl are a group of African, seed-eating, ground-nesting birds that resemble partridges, but with featherless heads and spangled gray plumage.

- Helmeted guineafowl, Numida meleagris (I)

== New World quail ==
Order: Galliformes Family: Odontophoridae

The New World quails are small, plump terrestrial birds only distantly related to the quails of the Old World, but named for their similar appearance and habits.

- Northern bobwhite, Colinus virginianus (I)

== Pheasants, grouse, and allies ==
Order: Galliformes Family: Phasianidae

The Phasianidae are a family of terrestrial birds which consists of quails, partridges, snowcocks, francolins, spurfowls, tragopans, monals, pheasants, peafowls, and jungle fowls. In general, they are plump (although they vary in size) and have broad, relatively short wings.

- Red junglefowl, Gallus gallus (I)
- Common pheasant, Phaisanus colchicus (I)
- Wild turkey, Meleagris gallopavo (I) (Ex)

== Flamingos ==
Order: Phoenicopteriformes Family: Phoenicopteridae

Flamingos are gregarious wading birds, usually 3 to 5 feet (0.9 to 1.5 m) tall, found in both the Western and Eastern Hemispheres. Flamingos filter-feed on shellfish and algae. Their oddly shaped beaks are specially adapted to separate mud and silt from the food they consume and, uniquely, are used upside-down.

- American flamingo, Phoenicopterus ruber

== Grebes ==
Order: Podicipediformes Family: Podicipedidae

Grebes are small to medium-large freshwater diving birds. They have lobed toes and are excellent swimmers and divers. However, they have their feet placed far back on the body, making them quite ungainly on land.

- Least grebe, Tachybaptus dominicus
- Pied-billed grebe, Podilymbus podiceps

== Pigeons and doves ==
Order: Columbiformes Family: Columbidae

Pigeons and doves are stout-bodied birds with short necks and short slender bills with a fleshy cere.

- Rock pigeon, Columba livia (I)
- Scaly-naped pigeon, Patagioenas squamosa
- White-crowned pigeon, Patagioenas leucocephala
- Plain pigeon, Patagioenas inornata
- Eurasian collared-dove, Streptopelia decaocto (I)
- Common ground dove, Columbina passerina
- Ruddy quail-dove, Geotrygon montana
- White-fronted quail-dove, Geotrygon leucometopia (E-DR), (E) (Note: While there might be historical records of white-fronted quail-dove in Haiti, the only confirmed records are in the Dominican Republic.)
- Key West quail-dove, Geotrygon chrysia
- White-winged dove, Zenaida asiatica
- Zenaida dove, Zenaida aurita
- Mourning dove, Zenaida macroura

== Cuckoos ==
Order: Cuculiformes Family: Cuculidae

The family Cuculidae includes cuckoos, roadrunners, and anis. These birds are of variable size with slender bodies, long tails, and strong legs.

- Smooth-billed ani, Crotophaga ani
- Yellow-billed cuckoo, Coccyzus americanus
- Mangrove cuckoo, Coccyzus minor
- Black-billed cuckoo, Coccyzus erythropthalmus (A)
- Bay-breasted cuckoo, Coccyzus rufigularis (E) (Note: The bay-breasted cuckoo is "extremely rare, or even extinct, in Haiti".)
- Hispaniolan lizard-cuckoo, Coccyzus longirostris (E)

== Nightjars and allies ==
Order: Caprimulgiformes Family: Caprimulgidae

Nightjars are medium-sized nocturnal birds that usually nest on the ground. They have long wings, short legs, and very short bills. Most have small feet, of little use for walking, and long pointed wings. Their soft plumage is camouflaged to resemble bark or leaves.

- Common nighthawk, Chordeiles minor
- Antillean nighthawk, Chordeiles gundlachii
- Least pauraque, Siphonorhis brewsteri (E)
- Chuck-will's-widow, Antrostomus carolinensis
- Hispaniolan nightjar, Antrostomus ekmani (E) (Note: The International Ornithological Congress (IOC) taxonomy treats the local subspecies of Greater Antillean nightjar as a separate species, Hispaniolan nightjar, Antrostomus ekmani.)

== Potoos ==
Order: Nyctibiiformes Family: Nyctibiidae

The potoos (sometimes called poor-me-ones) are large near passerine birds related to the nightjars and frogmouths. They are nocturnal insectivores which lack the bristles around the mouth found in the true nightjars.

- Northern potoo, Nyctibius jamaicensis

== Swifts ==
Order: Apodiformes Family: Apodidae

Swifts are small birds which spend the majority of their lives flying. These birds have very short legs and never settle voluntarily on the ground, perching instead only on vertical surfaces. Many swifts have long swept-back wings which resemble a crescent or boomerang.

- Black swift, Cypseloides niger
- White-collared swift, Streptoprocne zonaris
- Chimney swift, Chaetura pelagica
- Antillean palm-swift, Tachornis phoenicobia

== Hummingbirds ==
Order: Apodiformes Family: Trochilidae

Hummingbirds are small birds capable of hovering in mid-air due to the rapid flapping of their wings. They are the only birds that can fly backwards.

- Hispaniolan mango, Anthracothorax dominicus
- Ruby-throated hummingbird, Archilochus colubris (A)
- Vervain hummingbird, Mellisuga minima
- Hispaniolan emerald, Riccordia swainsonii (E)

== Rails, gallinules, and coots ==
Order: Gruiformes Family: Rallidae

Rallidae is a large family of small to medium-sized birds which includes the rails, crakes, coots, and gallinules. Typically they inhabit dense vegetation in damp environments near lakes, swamps, or rivers. In general they are shy and secretive birds, making them difficult to observe. Most species have strong legs and long toes which are well adapted to soft uneven surfaces. They tend to have short, rounded wings and to be weak fliers.

- Spotted rail, Pardirallus maculatus
- Clapper rail, Rallus crepitans
- Sora, Porzana carolina
- Common gallinule, Gallinula galeata
- American coot, Fulica americana
- Purple gallinule, Porphyrio martinica
- Yellow-breasted crake, Haplocrex flaviventer
- Black rail, Laterallus jamaicensis

== Limpkin ==
Order: Gruiformes Family: Aramidae

The limpkin resembles a large rail. It has drab-brown plumage and a grayer head and neck.

- Limpkin, Aramus guarauna

== Thick-knees ==
Order: Charadriiformes Family: Burhinidae

The thick-knees are a group of waders found worldwide within the tropical zone, with some species also breeding in temperate Europe and Australia. They are medium to large waders with strong black or yellow-black bills, large yellow eyes, and cryptic plumage. Despite being classed as waders, most species have a preference for arid or semi-arid habitats.

- Double-striped thick-knee, Hesperoburhinus bistriatus

== Stilts and avocets ==
Order: Charadriiformes Family: Recurvirostridae

Recurvirostridae is a family of large wading birds which includes the avocets and stilts. The avocets have long legs and long up-curved bills. The stilts have extremely long legs and long, thin, straight bills.

- Black-necked stilt, Himantopus mexicanus
- American avocet, Recurvirostra americana (A)

== Oystercatchers ==
Order: Charadriiformes Family: Haematopodidae

The oystercatchers are large and noisy plover-like birds, with strong bills used for smashing or prising open molluscs.

- American oystercatcher, Haematopus palliatus

== Plovers and lapwings ==
Order: Charadriiformes Family: Charadriidae

The family Charadriidae includes the plovers, dotterels, and lapwings. They are small to medium-sized birds with compact bodies, short thick necks, and long, usually pointed, wings. They are found in open country worldwide, mostly in habitats near water.

- Black-bellied plover, Pluvialis squatarola
- American golden-plover, Pluvialis dominica (A)
- Pacific golden-plover, Pluvialis fulva (A)
- Killdeer, Charadrius vociferus
- Semipalmated plover, Charadrius semipalmatus
- Piping plover, Charadrius melodus (A)
- Wilson's plover, Charadrius wilsonia
- Snowy plover, Charadrius nivosus

== Jacanas ==
Order: Charadriiformes Family: Jacanidae

The jacanas are a group of waders found throughout the tropics. They are identifiable by their huge feet and claws which enable them to walk on floating vegetation in the shallow lakes that are their preferred habitat.

- Northern jacana, Jacana spinosa

== Sandpipers and allies ==
Order: Charadriiformes Family: Scolopacidae

Scolopacidae is a large diverse family of small to medium-sized shorebirds including the sandpipers, curlews, godwits, shanks, tattlers, woodcocks, snipes, dowitchers, and phalaropes. The majority of these species eat small invertebrates picked out of the mud or soil. Variation in length of legs and bills enables multiple species to feed in the same habitat, particularly on the coast, without direct competition for food.

- Upland sandpiper, Bartramia longicauda (A)
- Whimbrel, Numenius phaeopus
- Black-tailed godwit, Limosa limosa (A)
- Hudsonian godwit, Limosa haemastica (A)
- Marbled godwit, Limosa fedoa (A)
- Ruddy turnstone, Arenaria interpres
- Red knot, Calidris canutus (A)
- Stilt sandpiper, Calidris himantopus
- Sanderling, Calidris alba
- Dunlin, Calidris alpina
- Baird's sandpiper, Calidris bairdii (A)
- Least sandpiper, Calidris minutilla
- White-rumped sandpiper, Calidris fuscicollis
- Buff-breasted sandpiper, Calidris subruficollis (A)
- Pectoral sandpiper, Calidris melanotos
- Semipalmated sandpiper, Calidris pusilla
- Western sandpiper, Calidris mauri
- Short-billed dowitcher, Limnodromus griseus
- Long-billed dowitcher, Limnodromus scolopaceus (A)
- Wilson's snipe, Gallinago delicata
- Spotted sandpiper, Actitis macularius
- Solitary sandpiper, Tringa solitaria
- Lesser yellowlegs, Tringa flavipes
- Willet, Tringa semipalmata
- Greater yellowlegs, Tringa melanoleuca
- Wilson's phalarope, Phalaropus tricolor (A)
- Red-necked phalarope, Phalaropus lobatus (A)

== Skuas and jaegers ==
Order: Charadriiformes Family: Stercorariidae

The family Stercorariidae are, in general, medium to large birds, typically with gray or brown plumage, often with white markings on the wings. They nest on the ground in temperate and arctic regions and are long-distance migrants.

- Great skua, Stercorarius skua (A)
- Pomarine jaeger, Stercorarius pomarinus
- Parasitic jaeger, Stercorarius parasiticus
- Long-tailed jaeger, Stercorarius longicaudus (A)

== Gulls, terns, and skimmers ==
Order: Charadriiformes Family: Laridae

Laridae is a family of medium to large seabirds and includes gulls, kittiwakes, terns and skimmers. They are typically gray or white, often with black markings on the head or wings. They have longish bills and webbed feet. Terns are a group of generally medium to large seabirds typically with gray or white plumage, often with black markings on the head. Most terns hunt fish by diving but some pick insects off the surface of fresh water. Terns are generally long-lived birds, with several species known to live in excess of 30 years. Skimmers are a small family of tropical tern-like birds. They have an elongated lower mandible which they use to feed by flying low over the water surface and skimming the water for small fish.

- Black-legged kittiwake, Rissa tridactyla (A)
- Bonaparte's gull, Chroicocephalus philadelphia (A)
- Laughing gull, Leucophaeus atricilla
- Franklin's gull, Leucophaeus pipixcan (A)
- Ring-billed gull, Larus delawarensis
- Herring gull, Larus argentatus
- Lesser black-backed gull, Larus fuscus
- Great black-backed gull, Larus marinus
- Brown noddy, Anous stolidus
- Sooty tern, Onychoprion fuscata
- Bridled tern, Onychoprion anaethetus
- Least tern, Sternula antillarum
- Gull-billed tern, Gelochelidon nilotica
- Caspian tern, Hydroprogne caspia
- Black tern, Chlidonias niger
- Roseate tern, Sterna dougallii
- Common tern, Sterna hirundo
- Forster's tern, Sterna forsteri (A)
- Royal tern, Thalasseus maxima
- Sandwich tern, Thalasseus sandvicensis
- Black skimmer, Rynchops niger (A)

== Tropicbirds ==
Order: Phaethontiformes Family: Phaethontidae

Tropicbirds are slender white birds of tropical oceans with exceptionally long central tail feathers. Their heads and long wings have black markings.

- White-tailed tropicbird, Phaethon lepturus
- Red-billed tropicbird, Phaethon aethereus (A)

== Southern storm-petrels ==
Order: Procellariiformes Family: Oceanitidae

The storm-petrels are the smallest seabirds, relatives of the petrels, feeding on planktonic crustaceans and small fish picked from the surface, typically while hovering. The flight is fluttering and sometimes bat-like. Until 2018, this family's species were included with the other storm-petrels in family Hydrobatidae.

- Wilson's storm-petrel, Oceanites oceanicus (A)

== Northern storm-petrels ==
Order: Procellariiformes Family: Hydrobatidae

Though the members of this family are similar in many respects to the southern storm-petrels, including their general appearance and habits, there are enough genetic differences to warrant their placement in a separate family.

- Leach's storm-petrel, Hydrobates leucorhous (A)

== Shearwaters and petrels ==
Order: Procellariiformes Family: Procellariidae

The procellariids are the main group of medium-sized "true petrels", characterised by united nostrils with medium septum and a long outer functional primary.

- Black-capped petrel, Pterodroma hasitata
- Cory's shearwater, Calonectris diomedea (A)
- Great shearwater, Ardenna gravis (A)
- Manx shearwater, Puffinus puffinus (A)
- Sargasso shearwater, Puffinus lherminieri (A)

== Storks ==
Order: Ciconiiformes Family: Ciconiidae

Storks are large, long-legged, long-necked, wading birds with long, stout bills. Storks are mute, but bill-clattering is an important mode of communication at the nest. Their nests can be large and may be reused for many years. Many species are migratory.

- Jabiru, Jabiru mycteria (Ex)
- Wood stork, Mycteria americana (Ex?)

== Frigatebirds ==
Order: Suliformes Family: Fregatidae

Frigatebirds are large seabirds usually found over tropical oceans. They are large, black-and-white, or completely black, with long wings and deeply forked tails. The males have colored inflatable throat pouches. They do not swim or walk and cannot take off from a flat surface. Having the largest wingspan-to-body-weight ratio of any bird, they are essentially aerial, able to stay aloft for more than a week.

- Magnificent frigatebird, Fregata magnificens

== Boobies and gannets ==
Order: Suliformes Family: Sulidae

The sulids comprise the gannets and boobies. Both groups are medium to large coastal seabirds that plunge-dive for fish.

- Masked booby, Sula dactylatra
- Brown booby, Sula leucogaster
- Red-footed booby, Sula sula
- Northern gannet, Morus bassanus (A)

== Anhingas ==
Order: Suliformes Family: Anhingidae

Anhingas are often called "snake-birds" because of their long thin neck, which gives a snake-like appearance when they swim with their bodies submerged. The males have black and dark-brown plumage, an erectile crest on the nape, and a larger bill than the female. The females have much paler plumage especially on the neck and underparts. The darters have completely webbed feet and their legs are short and set far back on the body. Their plumage is somewhat permeable, like that of cormorants, and they spread their wings to dry after diving.

- Anhinga, Anhinga anhinga (A)

== Cormorants and shags ==
Order: Suliformes Family: Phalacrocoracidae

Phalacrocoracidae is a family of medium to large coastal, fish-eating seabirds that includes cormorants and shags. Plumage coloration varies, with the majority having mainly dark plumage, some species being black-and-white, and a few being colorful.

- Double-crested cormorant, Nannopterum auritum (A)
- Neotropic cormorant, Nannopterum brasilianum (A)

== Pelicans ==
Order: Pelecaniformes Family: Pelecanidae

Pelicans are large water birds with a distinctive pouch under their beak. As with other members of the order Pelecaniformes, they have webbed feet with four toes.

- American white pelican, Pelecanus erythrorhynchos (A)
- Brown pelican, Pelecanus occidentalis

== Herons, egrets, and bitterns ==
Order: Pelecaniformes Family: Ardeidae

The family Ardeidae contains the bitterns, herons, and egrets. Herons and egrets are medium to large wading birds with long necks and legs. Bitterns tend to be shorter necked and more wary. Members of Ardeidae fly with their necks retracted, unlike other long-necked birds such as storks, ibises, and spoonbills.

- American bittern, Botaurus lentiginosus (A)
- Least bittern, Ixobrychus exilis (A)
- Great blue heron, Ardea herodias
- Gray heron, Ardea cinerea (A)
- Great egret, Ardea alba
- Little egret, Egretta garzetta (A)
- Snowy egret, Egretta thula
- Little blue heron, Egretta caerulea
- Tricolored heron, Egretta tricolor
- Reddish egret, Egretta rufescens
- Cattle egret, Bubulcus ibis
- Green heron, Butorides virescens
- Black-crowned night-heron, Nycticorax nycticorax (A)
- Yellow-crowned night-heron, Nyctanassa violacea

== Ibises and spoonbills ==
Order: Pelecaniformes Family: Threskiornithidae

Threskiornithidae is a family of large terrestrial and wading birds which includes the ibises and spoonbills. They have long, broad wings with 11 primary and about 20 secondary feathers. They are strong fliers and despite their size and weight, very capable soarers.

- White ibis, Eudocimus albus
- Glossy ibis, Plegadis falcinellus
- Roseate spoonbill, Platalea ajaja

== New World vultures ==
Order: Cathartiformes Family: Cathartidae

The New World vultures are not closely related to Old World vultures, but superficially resemble them because of convergent evolution. Like the Old World vultures, they are scavengers. However, unlike Old World vultures, which find carcasses by sight, New World vultures have a good sense of smell with which they locate carrion.

- Turkey vulture, Cathartes aura

== Osprey ==
Order: Accipitriformes Family: Pandionidae

The family Pandionidae contains only one species, the osprey. The osprey is a medium-large raptor which is a specialist fish-eater with a worldwide distribution.

- Osprey, Pandion haliaetus

== Hawks, eagles, and kites ==
Order: Accipitriformes Family: Accipitridae

Accipitridae is a family of birds of prey, which includes hawks, eagles, kites, harriers, and Old World vultures. These birds have powerful hooked beaks for tearing flesh from their prey, strong legs, powerful talons, and keen eyesight.

- Swallow-tailed kite, Elanoides forficatus
- Northern harrier, Circus hudsonius
- Sharp-shinned hawk, Accipiter striatus
- Mississippi kite, Ictinia mississippiensis (A)
- Snail kite, Rosthramus sociabilis (A)
- Ridgway's hawk, Buteo ridgwayi (E)
- Broad-winged hawk, Buteo platypterus
- Swainson's hawk, Buteo swainsoni (A)
- Red-tailed hawk, Buteo jamaicensis

== Barn owls ==
Order: Strigiformes Family: Tytonidae

Barn-owls are medium to large owls with large heads and characteristic heart-shaped faces. They have long strong legs with powerful talons.

- American barn owl, Tyto furcata
- Ashy-faced owl, Tyto glaucops (E)

== Owls ==
Order: Strigiformes Family: Strigidae

The typical owls are small to large solitary nocturnal birds of prey. They have large forward-facing eyes and ears, a hawk-like beak, and a conspicuous circle of feathers around each eye called a facial disk.

- Burrowing owl, Athene cunicularia
- Stygian owl, Asio stygius (A)
- Short-eared owl, Asio flammeus
- Hispaniolan burrowing owl, Athene cunicularia troglodytes (E)

== Trogons ==
Order: Trogoniformes Family: Trogonidae

The family Trogonidae includes trogons and quetzals. Found in tropical woodlands worldwide, they feed on insects and fruit, and their broad bills and weak legs reflect their diet and arboreal habits. Although their flight is fast, they are reluctant to fly any distance. Trogons have soft, often colorful, feathers with distinctive male and female plumage.

- Hispaniolan trogon, Priotelus roseigaster (E)

== Todies ==
Order: Coraciiformes Family: Todidae

Todies are a group of small near-passerine forest species endemic to the Caribbean. These birds have colorful plumage and resemble small kingfishers, but have flattened bills with serrated edges. They eat small prey such as insects and lizards.

- Broad-billed tody, Todus subulatus (E)
- Narrow-billed tody, Todus angustirostris (E)

== Kingfishers ==
Order: Coraciiformes Family: Alcedinidae

Kingfishers are medium-sized birds with large heads, long, pointed bills, short legs, and stubby tails.

- Belted kingfisher, Megaceryle alcyon

== Woodpeckers ==
Order: Piciformes Family: Picidae

Woodpeckers are small to medium-sized birds with chisel-like beaks, short legs, stiff tails, and long tongues used for capturing insects. Some species have feet with two toes pointing forward and two backward, while several species have only three toes. Many woodpeckers have the habit of tapping noisily on tree trunks with their beaks.

- Antillean piculet, Nesoctites micromegas (E)
- Hispaniolan woodpecker, Melanerpes striatus (E)
- Yellow-bellied sapsucker, Sphyrapicus varius

== Falcons and caracaras ==
Order: Falconiformes Family: Falconidae

Falconidae is a family of diurnal birds of prey. They differ from hawks, eagles, and kites in that they kill with their beaks instead of their talons.

- American kestrel, Falco sparverius
- Merlin, Falco columbarius
- Peregrine falcon, Falco peregrinus

== New World and African parrots ==
Order: Psittaciformes Family: Psittacidae

Parrots are small to large birds with a characteristic curved beak. Their upper mandibles have slight mobility in the joint with the skull and they have a generally erect stance. All parrots are zygodactyl, having the four toes on each foot placed two at the front and two to the back.

- Monk parakeet, Myiopsitta monachus (I)
- Olive-throated parakeet, Eupsittula nana (I)
- Cuban macaw, Ara tricolor (Extinct) (Note: Though Avibase classes the Cuban macaw as present, none of the AOS, the Cornell Lab of Ornithology's Birds of the World, the IOC, or the Clements taxonomy note any historical occurrence on Hispaniola, even as a vagrant.)
- Hispaniolan parakeet, Psittacara chloropterus (E)
- Hispaniolan parrot, Amazona ventralis (E)

== Tyrant flycatchers ==
Order: Passeriformes Family: Tyrannidae

Tyrant flycatchers are passerine birds which occur throughout North and South America. They superficially resemble the Old World flycatchers, but are more robust and have stronger bills. They do not have the sophisticated vocal capabilities of the songbirds. Most, but not all, have plain coloring. As the name implies, most are insectivorous.

- Greater Antillean elaenia, Elaenia fallax
- Great crested flycatcher, Myiarchus crinitus (A)
- Stolid flycatcher, Myiarchus stolidus
- Tropical kingbird, Tyrannus melancholicus (A)
- Gray kingbird, Tyrannus dominicensis
- Loggerhead kingbird, Tyrannus caudifasciatus
- Scissor-tailed flycatcher, Tyrannus forficatus (A)
- Fork-tailed flycatcher, Tyrannus savana (A)
- Eastern wood-pewee, Contopus virens (A)
- Hispaniolan pewee, Contopus hispaniolensis (E)
- Hispaniolan kingbird, Tyrannus gabbii (E)
- Hispaniolan elaenia, Elaenia cherriei (E)

== Vireos, shrike-babblers, and erpornis ==
Order: Passeriformes Family: Vireonidae

The vireos are a group of small to medium-sized passerine birds. They are typically greenish in color and resemble New World warblers apart from their heavier bills.

- White-eyed vireo, Vireo griseus (A)
- Thick-billed vireo, Vireo crassirostris
- Flat-billed vireo, Vireo nanus (E)
- Yellow-throated vireo, Vireo flavifrons
- Philadelphia vireo, Vireo philadelphicus (A)
- Warbling vireo, Vireo gilvus (A)
- Red-eyed vireo, Vireo olivaceus (A)
- Black-whiskered vireo, Vireo altiloquus

== Crows, jays, and magpies ==
Order: Passeriformes Family: Corvidae

The family Corvidae includes crows, ravens, jays, choughs, magpies, treepies, nutcrackers, and ground jays. Corvids are above average in size among the Passeriformes, and some of the larger species show high levels of intelligence.

- Hispaniolan palm crow, Corvus palmarum (E-Hisp)
- White-necked crow, Corvus leucognaphalus (E)

== Swallows ==
Order: Passeriformes Family: Hirundinidae

The family Hirundinidae is adapted to aerial feeding. They have a slender streamlined body, long pointed wings, and a short bill with a wide gape. The feet are adapted to perching rather than walking, and the front toes are partially joined at the base.

- Bank swallow, Riparia riparia (A)
- Tree swallow, Tachycineta bicolor
- Golden swallow, Tachycineta euchrysea (E)
- Northern rough-winged swallow, Stelgidopteryx serripennis
- Purple martin, Progne subis (A)
- Caribbean martin, Progne dominicensis
- Cuban martin, Progne cryptoleuca (A)
- Barn swallow, Hirundo rustica
- Cliff swallow, Petrochelidon pyrrhonota (A)
- Cave swallow, Petrochelidon fulva

== Kinglets ==
Order: Passeriformes Family: Regulidae

The kinglets, also called crests, are a small group of birds often included in the Old World warblers, but frequently given family status because they also resemble the titmice.

- Ruby-crowned kinglet, Corthylio calendula (A)

== Palmchat ==
Order: Passeriformes Family: Dulidae

The palmchat is the only member of its family. Its name indicates its strong association with palms for feeding, roosting, and nesting.

- Palmchat, Dulus dominicus (E)

== Waxwings ==
Order: Passeriformes Family: Bombycillidae

The waxwings are a group of birds with soft silky plumage and unique red tips to some of the wing feathers. In the Bohemian and cedar waxwings, these tips look like sealing wax and give the group its name. These are arboreal birds of northern forests. They live on insects in summer and berries in winter.

- Cedar waxwing, Bombycilla cedrorum (A)

== Gnatcatchers ==
Order: Passeriformes Family: Polioptilidae

These dainty birds resemble Old World warblers in their build and habits, moving restlessly through the foliage seeking insects. The gnatcatchers and gnatwrens are mainly soft bluish gray in color and have the typical insectivore's long sharp bill. They are birds of fairly open woodland or scrub which nest in bushes or trees.

- Blue-gray gnatcatcher, Polioptila caerulea (A)

== Mockingbirds and thrashers ==
Order: Passeriformes Family: Mimidae

The mimids are a family of passerine birds that includes thrashers, mockingbirds, tremblers, and the New World catbirds. These birds are notable for their vocalizations, especially their ability to mimic a wide variety of birds and other sounds heard outdoors. Their coloring tends towards dull-grays and browns.

- Gray catbird, Dumetella carolinensis (A)
- Pearly-eyed thrasher, Margarops fuscatus
- Northern mockingbird, Mimus polyglottos

== Thrushes and allies ==
Order: Passeriformes Family: Turdidae

The thrushes are a group of passerine birds that occur mainly in the Old World. They are plump, soft plumaged, small to medium-sized insectivores or sometimes omnivores, often feeding on the ground. Many have attractive songs.

- Rufous-throated solitaire, Myadestes genibarbis
- Veery, Catharus fuscescens (A)
- Bicknell's thrush, Catharus bicknelli
- Swainson's thrush, Catharus ustulatus
- Wood thrush, Hylocichla mustelina (A)
- American robin, Turdus migratorius (A)
- La Selle thrush, Turdus swalesi (E)
- Eastern red-legged thrush, Turdus ardosiaceus

== Weavers and allies ==
Order: Passeriformes Family: Ploceidae

The weavers are small passerine birds related to the finches. They are seed-eating birds with rounded conical bills. The males of many species are brightly colored, usually in red or yellow and black, and some species show variation in color only in the breeding season.

- Village weaver, Ploceus cucullatus (I)

== Indigobirds ==
Order: Passeriformes Family: Viduidae

The Viduidae is a family of small passerine birds native to Africa that includes indigobirds and whydahs. All species are brood parasites which lay their eggs in the nests of estrildid finches. Species usually have black or indigo predominating in their plumage.

- Pin-tailed whydah (I) (Ex?)

== Waxbills and allies ==
Order: Passeriformes Family: Estrildidae

The estrildid finches are small passerine birds of the Old World tropics and Australasia. They are gregarious and often colonial seed eaters with short thick but pointed bills. They are all similar in structure and habits, but have wide variation in plumage colors and patterns.

- Scaly-breasted munia, Lonchura punctulata (I)
- Tricolored munia, Lonchura malacca (I)
- Chestnut munia, Lonchura atricapilla (I)
- Red avadavat, Amandava amandava (I) (A)

== Old World sparrows ==
Order: Passeriformes Family: Passeridae

Sparrows are small passerine birds. In general, sparrows tend to be small, plump, brown or gray birds with short tails and short powerful beaks. Sparrows are seed eaters, but they also consume small insects.

- House sparrow, Passer domesticus (I)

== Wagtails and pipits ==
Order: Passeriformes Family: Motacillidae

Motacillidae is a family of small passerine birds with medium to long tails. They include the wagtails, longclaws, and pipits. They are slender ground-feeding insectivores of open country.

- American pipit, Anthus rubescens (A)

== Finches, euphonias, and allies ==
Order: Passeriformes Family: Fringillidae

Finches are seed-eating passerine birds, that are small to moderately large and have a strong beak, usually conical and in some species very large. All have twelve tail feathers and nine primaries. These birds have a bouncing flight with alternating bouts of flapping and gliding on closed wings, and most sing well.

- Hispaniolan euphonia, Chlorophonia musica
- Hispaniolan crossbill, Loxia megaplaga (E)
- Antillean siskin, Spinus dominicensis (E)
- Hispaniolan euphonia, Euphonia musica (E)

== New World sparrows ==
Order: Passeriformes Family: Passerellidae

Until 2017, these species were considered part of the family Emberizidae. Most of the species are known as sparrows, but these birds are not closely related to the Old World sparrows which are in the family Passeridae. Many of these have distinctive head patterns.

- Grasshopper sparrow, Ammodramus savannarum
- Rufous-collared sparrow, Zonotrichia capensis
- Savannah sparrow, Passerculus sandwichensis (A)
- Song sparrow, Melospiza melodia (A)
- Lincoln's sparrow, Melospiza lincolnii (A)

== Chat-tanagers ==
Order: Passeriformes Family: Calyptophilidae

These two species were formerly classified as tanagers (family Thraupidae) but were placed in their own family in 2017.

- Western chat-tanager, Calyptophilus tertius (E)
- Eastern chat-tanager, Calyptophilus frugivorus (E) (Note: Though Avibase lists eastern chat-tanager as endemic to Haiti alone, the AOS, IOC, and Clements taxonomies place it in the Dominican Republic as well)

== Hispaniolan tanagers ==
Order: Passeriformes Family: Phaenicophilidae

The members of this small family were formerly classified as tanagers and New World warblers (family Parulidae) but were placed in their own family in 2017.

- Black-crowned palm-tanager, Phaenicophilus palmarum (E)
- Gray-crowned palm-tanager, Phaenicophilus poliocephalus (E-Haiti) (Note: The gray-crowned palm-tanager is considered endemic to Haiti because the few Dominican Republic records are unconfirmed.)
- White-winged warbler, Xenoligea montana (E)
- Green-tailed warbler, Microligea palustris (E)

== Spindalises ==
Order: Passeriformes Family: Spindalidae

The members of this small family are native to the Greater Antilles. They were formerly classified as tanagers but were placed in their own family in 2017.

- Hispaniolan spindalis, Spindalis dominicensis (E)

== Yellow-breasted chat ==
Order: Passeriformes Family: Icteriidae

This species was historically placed in the New World warblers but nonetheless most authorities were unsure if it belonged there. It was moved to its own family in 2017.

- Yellow-breasted chat, Icteria virens (A)

== Troupials and allies ==
Order: Passeriformes Family: Icteridae

The icterids are a group of small to medium-sized, often colorful, passerine birds restricted to the New World and include the grackles, New World blackbirds, and New World orioles. Most species have black as the predominant plumage color, often enlivened by yellow, orange, or red.

- Yellow-headed blackbird, Xanthocephalus xanthocephalus (A)
- Bobolink, Dolichonyx oryzivorus (A)
- Hispaniolan oriole, Icterus dominicensis (E)
- Orchard oriole, Icterus spurius (A)
- Baltimore oriole, Icterus galbula
- Tawny-shouldered blackbird, Agelaius humeralis
- Shiny cowbird, Molothrus bonariensis
- Great-tailed grackle, Quiscalus mexicanus (A)
- Greater Antillean grackle, Quiscalus niger

== New World warblers ==
Order: Passeriformes Family: Parulidae

The New World warblers are a group of small, often colorful, passerine birds restricted to the New World. Most are arboreal, but some are terrestrial. Most members of this family are insectivores.

- Ovenbird, Seiurus aurocapilla
- Worm-eating warbler, Helmitheros vermivorum
- Louisiana waterthrush, Parkesia motacilla
- Northern waterthrush, Parkesia noveboracensis
- Golden-winged warbler, Vermivora chrysoptera (A)
- Blue-winged warbler, Vermivora cyanoptera (A)
- Black-and-white warbler, Mniotilta varia
- Prothonotary warbler, Protonotaria citrea
- Swainson's warbler, Limnothlypis swainsonii (A)
- Tennessee warbler, Leiothlypis peregrina (A)
- Nashville warbler, Leiothlypis ruficapilla (A)
- Connecticut warbler, Oporornis agilis
- Mourning warbler, Geothlypis philadelphia (A)
- Kentucky warbler, Geothlypis formosa (A)
- Common yellowthroat, Geothlypis trichas
- Hooded warbler, Setophaga citrina
- American redstart, Setophaga ruticilla
- Cape May warbler, Setophaga tigrina
- Northern parula, Setophaga americana
- Magnolia warbler, Setophaga magnolia
- Bay-breasted warbler, Setophaga castanea (A)
- Blackburnian warbler, Setophaga fusca (A)
- Yellow warbler, Setophaga petechia
- Chestnut-sided warbler, Setophaga pensylvanica (A)
- Blackpoll warbler, Setophaga striata
- Black-throated blue warbler, Setophaga caerulescens
- Townsend's warbler, Setophaga townsendi (A)
- Palm warbler, Setophaga palmarum
- Pine warbler, Setophaga pinus
- Yellow-rumped warbler, Setophaga coronata
- Yellow-throated warbler, Setophaga dominica (A)
- Prairie warbler, Setophaga discolor
- Black-throated green warbler, Setophaga virens
- Canada warbler, Cardellina canadensis (A)
- Wilson's warbler, Cardellina pusilla (A)

== Cardinals and allies ==
Order: Passeriformes Family: Cardinalidae

The cardinals are a family of robust, seed-eating birds with strong bills. They are typically associated with open woodland. The sexes usually have distinct plumages.

- Summer tanager, Piranga rubra (A)
- Scarlet tanager, Piranga olivacea
- Western tanager, Piranga ludoviciana (A)
- Rose-breasted grosbeak, Pheucticus ludovicianus
- Blue grosbeak, Passerina caerulea (A)
- Indigo bunting, Passerina cyanea
- Painted bunting, Passerina ciris (A)

== Tanagers and allies ==
Order: Passeriformes Family: Thraupidae

The tanagers are a large group of small to medium-sized passerine birds restricted to the New World, mainly in the tropics. Many species are brightly colored. As a family they are omnivorous, but individual species specialize in eating fruits, seeds, insects, or other types of food. Most have short, rounded wings.

- Bananaquit, Coereba flaveola
- Yellow-faced grassquit, Tiaris olivaceus
- Greater Antillean bullfinch, Loxigilla violacea
- Black-faced grassquit, Melanospiza bicolor

== See also ==
- List of birds
- Lists of birds by region
