= Passeroidea =

Scientific classification
- Kingdom: Animalia
- Phylum: Chordata
- Class: Aves
- Order: Passeriformes
- Suborder: Passeri
- Infraorder: Passerides
- Parvorder: Passerida
- Superfamily: Passeroidea

Families
- See text

Superfamily of birds

Passeroidea is a superfamily of birds within the parvorder Passerida, which is within Passeriformes. It includes, but is not limited to, cardinals and allies and Old World sparrows as well as many other families of birds.

== Taxonomy ==
The following list of families and numbers of species follows the 2025 version of the AviList:

=== Basal passeroids ===
This group branched off very early in the superfamily's history.

- Family Promeropidae (sugarbirds; 2 species)
- Family Modulatricidae (dapple-throat and allies; 3 species)
- Family Dicaeidae (flowerpeckers; 56 species)
- Family Nectariniidae (spiderhunters and sunbirds; 151 species)
- Family Chloropseidae (leafbirds; 12 species)
- Family Irenidae (fairy-bluebirds; 3 species)

=== Core passeroids ===
==== Estrilid and passerid lines ====
This group is highly diverse; it contains six families of Old World seed- and insect-eaters, two families with a near-cosmopolitan distribution, and the New World olive warbler.

- Family Peucedramidae (olive warbler; 1 species)
- Family Urocynchramidae (Przevalski's finch; 1 species)
- Family Ploceidae (weavers; 122 species)
- Family Viduidae (indigobirds and whydahs; 20 species)
- Family Estrildidae (munias, waxbills and allies; 138 species)
- Family Prunellidae (accentors; 12 species)
- Family Passeridae (snowfinches and Old World sparrows; 43 species)
- Family Motacillidae (wagtails and pipits; 70 species)
- Family Fringillidae (finches, euphonias, and allies; 236 species)

==== Emberizoidea ====
This subclade is as diverse as the Old World Seedeaters, but instead, it has taken over the New World, with one family (Emberizidae) in the Old World and one family (Calcariidae) circumboreal. They are also known as the nine-primaried oscines.

- Family Rhodinocichlidae (thrush-tanager; 1 species)
- Family Calcariidae (longspurs and snow buntings; 6 species)
- Family Emberizidae (buntings; 44 species)
- Family Passerellidae (New World sparrows; 138 species)
- Family Calyptophilidae (chat-tanagers; 2 species)
- Family Zeledoniidae (wrenthrush; 1 species)
- Family Phaenicophilidae (Hispaniolan tanagers; 4 species)
- Family Nesospingidae (Puerto Rican tanager; 1 species)
- Family Spindalidae (spindalises; 4 species)
- Family Teretistridae (Cuban Warblers; 2 species)
- Family Icteridae (New World blackbirds, troupials, and allies; 108 species)
- Family Parulidae (New World warblers; 116 species)
- Family Cardinalidae (cardinals and allies; 52 species)
- Family Mitrospingidae (mitrospringid tanagers; 4 species)
- Family Thraupidae (typical tanagers; 390 species)

== Description and ecology ==
Because of its large evolutionary diversity, Passeroidea has an extremely wide variety of behavior, bill shapes, and size.

=== Diet ===
Though many basal passeroids have specialized feeding behavior (such as sunbirds, using nectar and insects), most core passeroids have simple, stout, seed-cracking bills. Some, like the New World warblers, are insectivores with slender bills.

=== Plumage ===
This superfamily is well-known for having a large number of brightly-colored species. Many species also have notable sexual dimorphism, where males are brightly colored to attract females while females are mainly brown and black, with camouflage-patterned plumage, though others like the New World Sparrows do not display this (males and females look the same).
