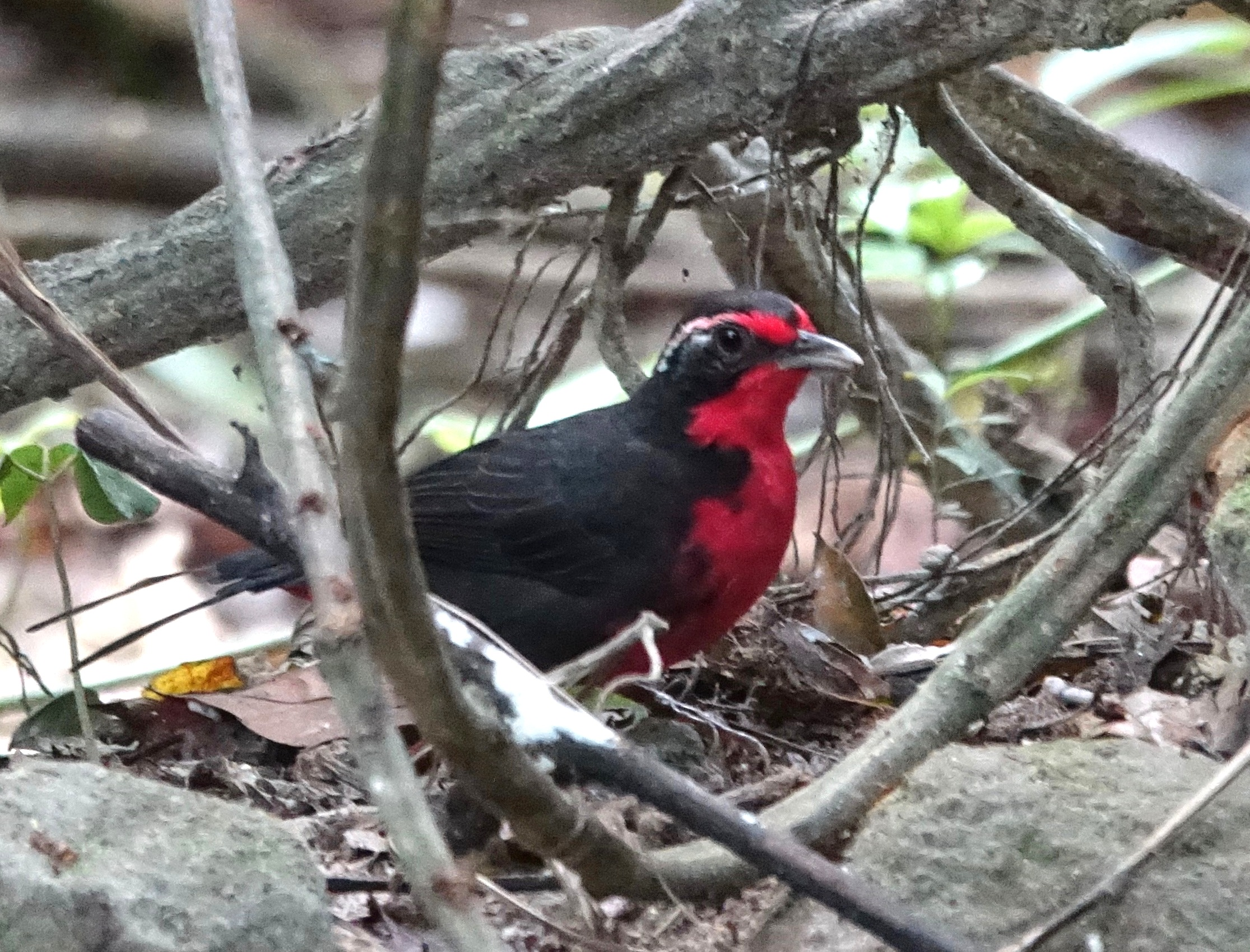
- Male in Panama

Conservation status
- Least Concern (IUCN 3.1)

Scientific classification
- Kingdom: Animalia
- Phylum: Chordata
- Class: Aves
- Order: Passeriformes
- Superfamily: Emberizoidea
- Family: Rhodinocichlidae; Ridgway, 1902
- Genus: Rhodinocichla; Hartlaub, 1853
- Species: R. rosea

Binomial name
- Rhodinocichla rosea (Lesson, RP, 1832)

= Rosy thrush-tanager =

Species of bird

The rosy thrush-tanager (Rhodinocichla rosea) or rose-breasted thrush-tanager is a species of bird in its own family, Rhodinocichlidae. It is found in Colombia, Costa Rica, Mexico, Panama, and Venezuela.

== Taxonomy and systematics ==
The rosy thrush-tanager has a complicated taxonomic history. It was formally described in 1832 with the binomial Furnarius roseus, identifying it as a hornero in the ovenbird family Furnariidae. It was later recognized as an oscine ("songbird") and in 1853 was placed in its own genus Rhodinocichla. Its placement was not settled; nineteenth century authors suggested it belonged to one of several families. In the early twentieth century it settled into the tanager family Thraupidae and remained there into the twenty-first. A 2015 study suggested that it belonged in its own family. This classification was soon adopted by some taxonomic systems but others placed it as incertae sedis pending further evaluation. By 2018 the major systems had assigned it to its own family Rhodinocichlidae and placed it in the linear sequence between the families Calcariidae (longspurs and snow buntings) and emberizidae (Old World buntings).

The rosy thrush-tanager has these five subspecies:

- R. r. schistacea Ridgway, 1878
- R. r. eximia Ridgway, 1902
- R. r. harterti Hellmayr, 1918
- R. r. beebei Phelps, WH & Phelps, WH Jr, 1949
- R. r. rosea (Lesson, RP, 1832)

Within the species, the Clements taxonomy calls R. r. schistacea the "rosy thrush-tanager (Mexican)", R. r. eximia the "rosy thrush-tanager (Panama)", and the other three as a group, the "rosy thrush-tanager (southern)".

== Description ==
The rosy thrush-tanager is 19 to 21.5 cm (7.5 to 8.5 in) long and weighs about 43 to 52 g (1.5 to 1.8 oz). It is a slim bird with a wide rounded tail and a long decurved bill. With these characteristics it resembles a mockingbird or thrasher (Mimidae). The species is sexually dimorphic. Adult males of the nominate subspecies R. r. rosea have rosy red lores that become a white supercilium that extends well past the eye. Their crown, face, nape, back, rump, wings, and tail are dark gray to blackish gray. Their throat and central breast and belly are rosy red. The sides of their breast and belly and their flanks are blackish gray. Adult females have a similar pattern to the male's. However, the male's rosy red areas are deep cinnamon, rufus orange, or tawny, and their upperparts are paler than the male's.

The other subspecies of the rosy thrush-tanager differ from the nominate and each other thus:

- R. r. schistacea: longer wings and tail than nominate; both sexes have medium gray upperparts
- R. r. eximia: both sexes have blackish upperparts
- R. r. harterti: shorter wings and tail than nominate; both sexes have a smaller supercilium than the nominate and medium gray upperparts
- R. r. beebei: shorter wings and tail than nominate; males have a smaller supercilium than the nominate; both sexes have medium gray upperparts

Both sexes of all subspecies have a brown iris, a black maxilla, a pale horn-gray mandible, and dark grayish brown legs and feet. The maxilla and mandible have varying amounts of yellow, even among individuals of a subspecies.

== Distribution and habitat ==
The rosy thrush-tanager has a highly disjunct distribution: No two subspecies have contiguous ranges. They are found thus:

- R. r. schistacea: western Mexico between Sinaloa and Michoacán
- R. r. eximia from the upper valley of the Térraba River in southwestern Costa Rica through Panama to Panamá Province
- R. r. harterti: western slope of Colombia's Eastern Andes
- R. r. beebei: the Serranía del Perijá that straddles the Colombia-Venezuela border
- R. r. rosea: northern Venezuela's Andes in Lara and Falcón, mountains in Yaracuy, and the Coastal Range from Carabobo to Miranda

In most areas the rosy thrush-tanager inhabits arid to semi-arid woodlands, scrublands, and secondary forest; in Venezuela it also occurs in moister semi-deciduous woodland. In all areas it greatly favors dense undergrowth in which it usually remains hidden. In elevation it ranges between about 200 and 1,000 m (700 and 3,300 ft) in Costa Rica, between about 100 and 1,800 m (300 and 5,900 ft) in Colombia, and between about 450 and 1,450 m (1,500 and 4,800 ft) in Venezuela.

== Behavior ==
=== Movement ===
The rosy thrush-tanager is a year-round resident.

=== Feeding ===
The rosy thrush-tanager's diet has not been studied in detail. The species is assumed to be primarily an insectivore that also includes some plant material in its diet. Known foods include beetles, ants, spiders, and seeds. There is also at least one record of its eating a vertebrate, a frog. It usually forages singly or in pairs, and almost entirely on the ground in dense cover. It has been observed flicking leaves aside with its bill.

=== Breeding ===
The rosy thrush-tanager's breeding seasons have not been fully defined. The seasons include July in Mexico, span January to September in Costa Rica, and include May and June in Venezuela. Its nest is a bowl made from leaves place on a foundation of coarse sticks and typically placed near the ground in a dense thicket. Clutches of two and three are known. The eggs are white with blackish markings. Both sexes incubate the clutch and brood and provision nestlings. The incubation period and time to fledging are not known.

=== Vocalization ===
The rosy thrush-tanager's song is "varied loud and rich whistles, transcribed as cho-oh, chowee or wheeo-cheehoh, chweeoo and chee-oo. Pairs sing in duet, trading different phrases in a loud "rollicking" bout. The species' calls include "chowk, "hu-weep", and "queo".

== Status ==
The IUCN has assessed the rosy thrush-tanager as being of Least Concern. Its estimated population of between 20,000 and 50,000 mature individuals is believed to be decreasing. No immediate threats have been identified. It is considered uncommon in Costa Rica and locally uncommon in Colombia. In Venezuela it is "[d]ecidedly local...but sometimes surprisingly common". "The isolation of the disjunct populations in Mexico causes this species to be of high conservation concern locally." "Loss of forests in Panama, Colombia, and Venezuela threaten to further fragment habitat used by disjunct populations, causing this species to be of high conservation concern within those countries."
