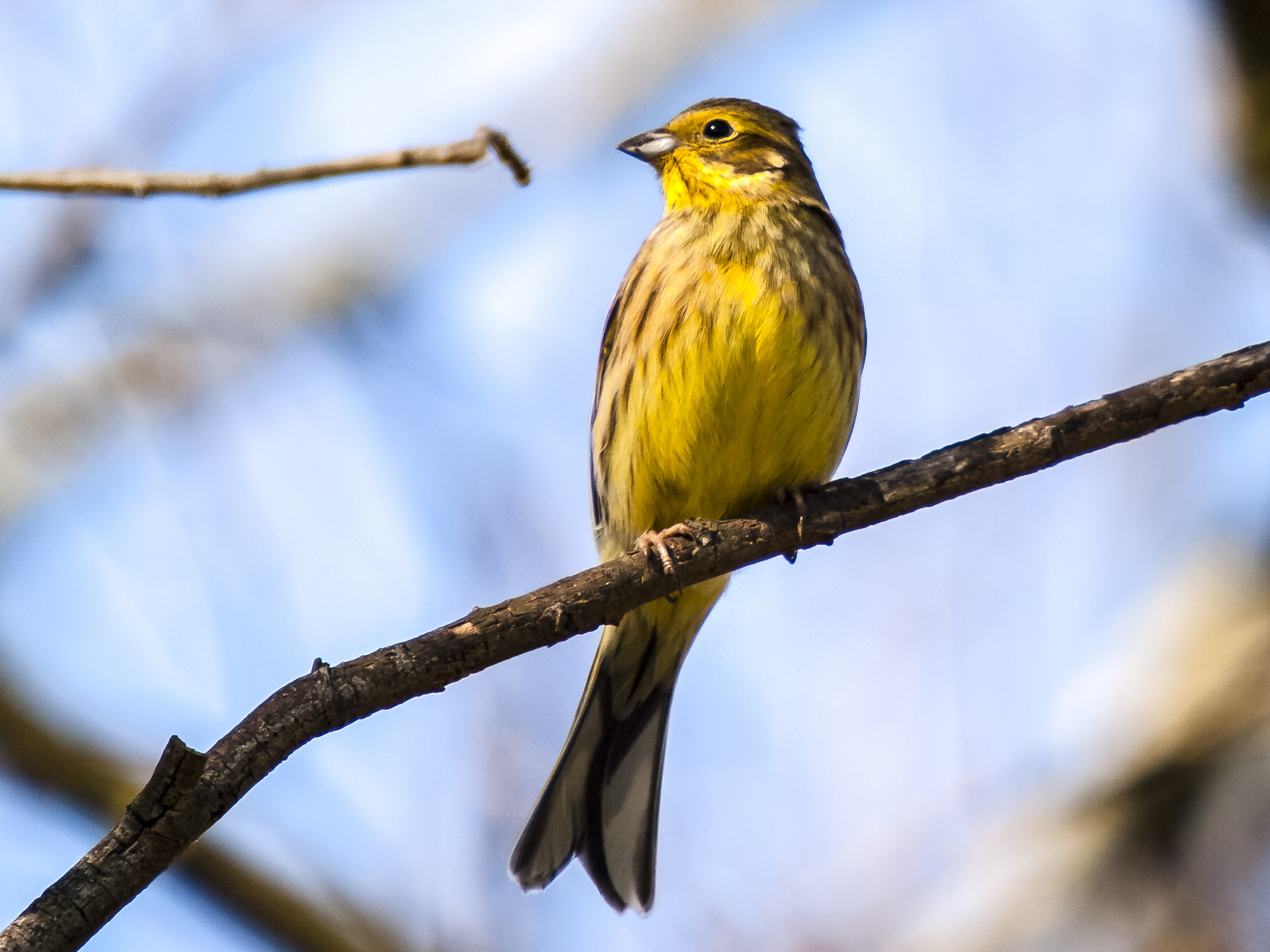
- Yellowhammer (Emberiza citrinella)
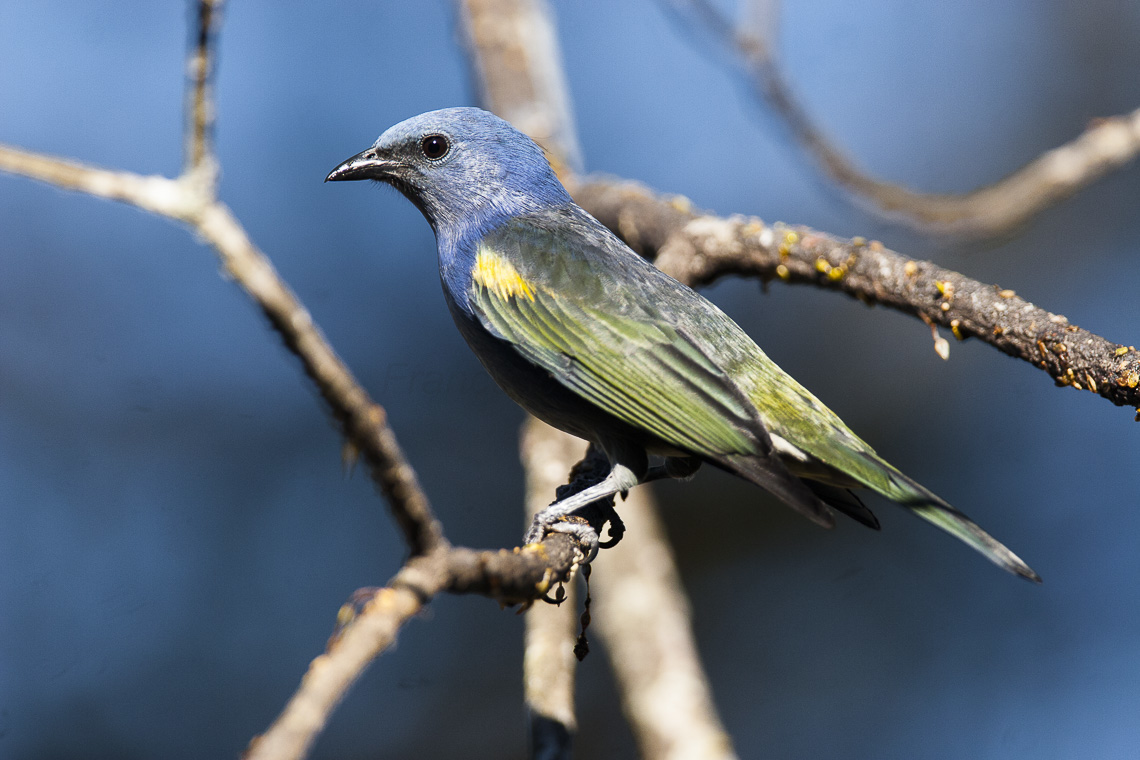
- Golden-chevroned tanager (Thraupis ornata)

Scientific classification
- Kingdom: Animalia
- Phylum: Chordata
- Class: Aves
- Order: Passeriformes
- Parvorder: Passerida
- Superfamily: Emberizoidea; Vigors, 1831

Type species
- Emberiza citrinella Linnaeus, 1758

Families
- Calcariidae; Rhodinocichlidae; Emberizidae; Passerellidae; Calyptophilidae; Phaenicophilidae; Zeledoniidae; Teretistridae; Icteridae; Parulidae; Mitrospingidae; Cardinalidae; Thraupidae

= Emberizoidea =

Emberizoids Temporal range: Miocene-Holocene, 15–0 Ma

Superfamily of passerine birds

Emberizoidea is a superfamily of passerines that are referred to as the New World nine-primaried oscines that includes majority of endemics which are exclusive to the New World. Nearly 892 species belong to this group as it includes buntings, American sparrows, the New World blackbirds, the parulid warblers, the cardinals, and the tanagers.

== Evolution ==
The group originated after a rapid speciation event in North America after arriving from Eurasia via the Bering Strait during the Miocene epoch. Two groups from within the emberizoids diversified further in the Neotropics, where one clade comprised several small Caribbean endemic species and the other, the tanager-cardinal group, in South America. Another two families, the Emberizidae (buntings) and the Calcariidae (longspurs and snow buntings), returned to Eurasia and colonized.

== Taxonomy ==
The interrelationships among the emberizoids has been a source of contention as several genera have been shifted around in many phylogenetic studies. The cladogram of the emberizoids shown below is based on the analysis of Carl Oliveros and colleagues published in 2019. (Note: A 2020 study by Heiner Kuhl and colleagues omitted Rhodinocichlidae, Calyptophilidae and Phaenicophilidae but obtained a similar phylogeny for the remaining families. Earlier studies using more limited DNA sequence data obtained different relationships between the families.)

- - Fringillidae
  - Emberizoidea
    - - Rhodinocichlidae
      - - - Calcariidae
          - Emberizidae
        - - - Cardinalidae
            - - Mitrospingidae
              - Thraupidae
          - - Passerellidae
            - - - Parulidae
                - Icteridae (includes Icteria)
              - - Calyptophilidae
                - - Zeledoniidae
                  - Phaenicophilidae (includes Spindalis and Nesospingus)

The Oliveros at al (2019) study considered Spindalidae and Nesospingidae to both be part of Phaenicophilidae, and Icteriidae as being a part of Icteridae. In addition, while Teretistridae was not analyzed in that study, previous studies recovered them allied with Icteridae or Zeledoniidae.
