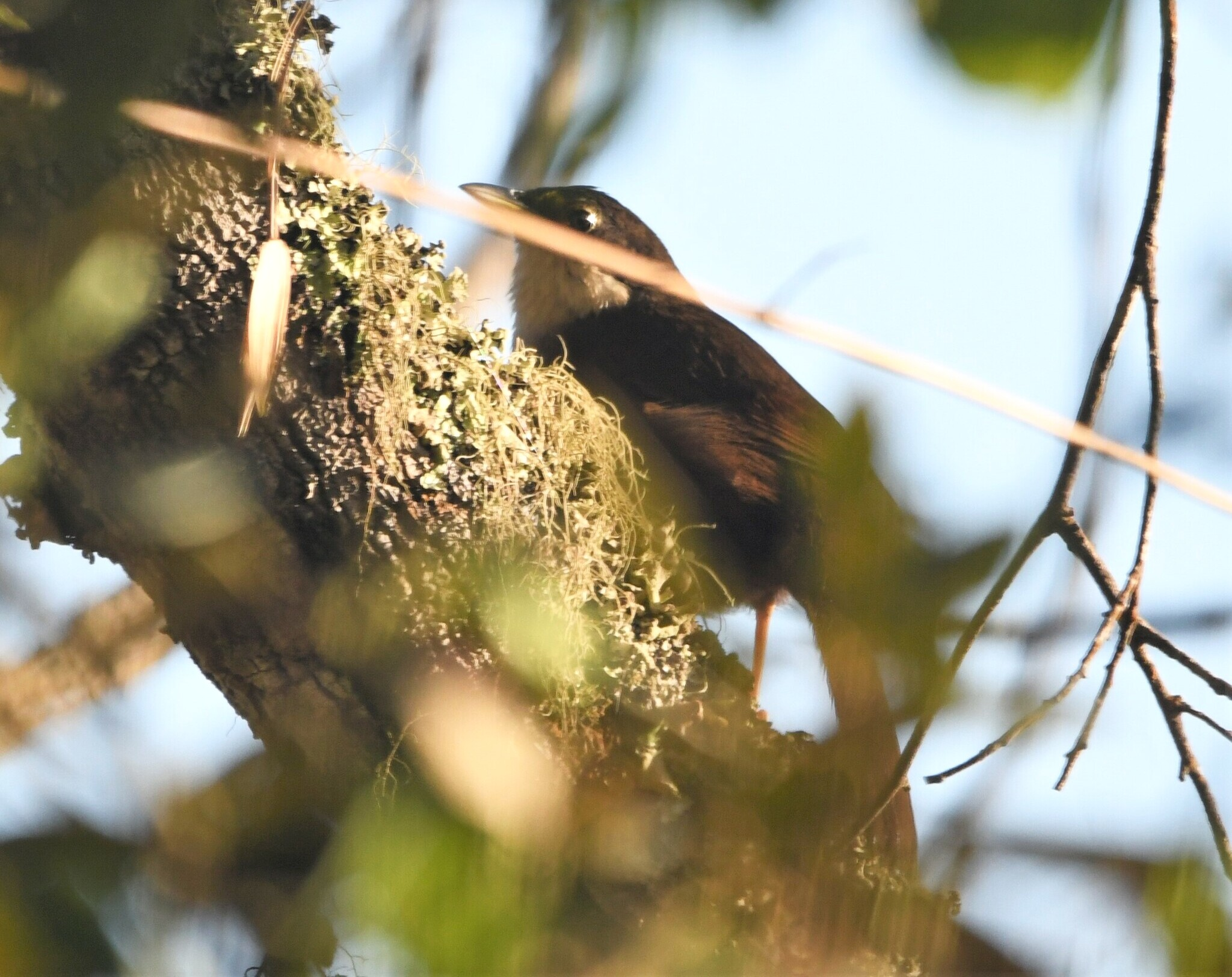

Conservation status
- Vulnerable (IUCN 3.1)

Scientific classification
- Kingdom: Animalia
- Phylum: Chordata
- Class: Aves
- Order: Passeriformes
- Family: Calyptophilidae
- Genus: Calyptophilus
- Species: C. tertius

Binomial name
- Calyptophilus tertius Wetmore, 1929

Synonyms
- Calyptophilus frugivorus tertius

= Western chat-tanager =

Species of bird endemic to Hispaniola

The western chat-tanager (Calyptophilus tertius) is a Vulnerable species of passerine bird belonging to the family Calyptophilidae. It is endemic to the island of Hispaniola which is shared by the Dominican Republic and Haiti.

== Taxonomy and systematics ==
The western chat-tanager shares its genus with the eastern chat-tanager (C. frugivorus), and was previously treated as a subspecies of it. There is a high degree of divergence between the two in mitochondrial DNA and intron sequences. Speciation is likely to have occurred on two ancient islands, which later fused to form present-day Hispaniola. The genus was long included in the family Thraupidae, the "true" tanagers, but it was moved in 2017. The western chat-tanager is monotypic.

== Description ==
The western chat-tanager is 20 to 21 cm (7.9 to 8.3 in) long and weighs about 40 to 55 g (1.4 to 1.9 oz). It has a long bill and tail, so it somewhat resembles a mockingbird's shape. The sexes have the same plumage. Adults have a dark olive-brown head, with a blackish crown and a small rusty spot between the eye and bill. The rest of their upperparts are dark reddish brown. Their throat and underparts are white, with a heavy wash of grayish brown on the flanks and lower belly.

== Distribution and habitat ==
The western chat-tanager is found throughout Hispaniola's highest mountain ranges, in southwestern Haiti's Massif de la Hotte and Chaîne de la Selle and the adjacent Sierra de Bahoruco in the southwestern Dominican Republic. It inhabits broadleaf forest and dense brushy areas, especially in ravines and near water. In elevation it occurs between 745 and 2,200 m (2,444.23 and 7,217.85 ft).

== Behavior ==
=== Movement ===
The western chat-tanager is a year-round resident throughout its range. It is secretive and usually encountered on or near the ground.

=== Feeding ===
The feeding behavior and diet of the western chat-tanager are not well known. Both are apparently similar to those of the eastern chat-tanager. That species forages on or near the ground, usually in pairs. Its diet is mostly insects and other invertebrates with a small amount of fruit.

=== Breeding ===
The western chat-tanager's breeding season is thought to be May to July. Only two nests have been described. They were bulky domes of coarse material like woody stems, vine tendrils, moss, and lichen with a lining of finer material, placed about 1 to 1.5 m (3 to 5 ft) above the ground. One held two eggs; after hatching, both parents provisioned the nestlings.

=== Vocalization ===
Both sexes of the western chat-tanager sing, usually at dawn. Their song is described as a buzzy "wee-chee-chee-chee". Their calls include a "chip-chip" and a "tick, tick, tick, tick...".

== Status ==
The IUCN has assessed the western chat-tanager as Vulnerable. It has a small range and its estimated population of 6700 to 13,300 mature individuals is believed to be decreasing. The main threats are logging and conversion of habitat to agriculture. Nest predation, thought to be mainly by black (Rattus rattus) and brown rats (R. norvegicus) as well as feral cats (Felis catus), is significant. It is "fairly numerous locally" in both countries and occurs in some protected areas, which, in Haiti, are only nominally supported.
