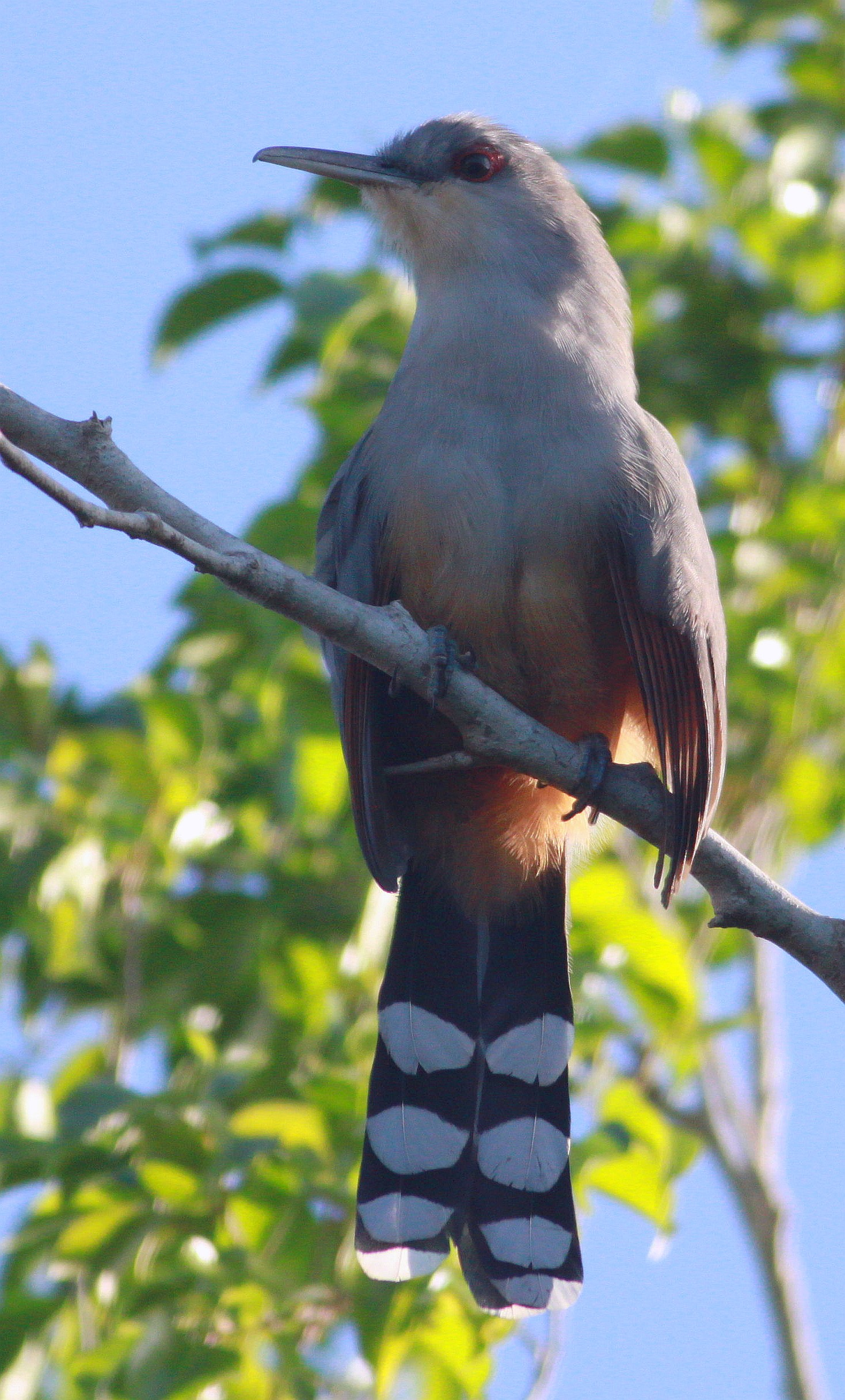

Conservation status
- Least Concern (IUCN 3.1)

Scientific classification
- Kingdom: Animalia
- Phylum: Chordata
- Class: Aves
- Order: Cuculiformes
- Family: Cuculidae
- Genus: Coccyzus
- Species: C. longirostris

Binomial name
- Coccyzus longirostris (Hermann, 1783)

Synonyms
- Saurothera longirostris

= Hispaniolan lizard cuckoo =

Species of bird

The Hispaniolan lizard cuckoo (Coccyzus longirostris) is a species of bird in the tribe Phaenicophaeini, subfamily Cuculinae of the cuckoo family Cuculidae. It is endemic to the island of Hispaniola that is shared by Haiti and the Dominican Republic.

== Taxonomy and systematics ==
The Hispaniolan lizard cuckoo and three other lizard cuckoos were once considered a single species. Individually, they were previously placed in the genus Saurothera that was later merged into the current Coccyzus, and they are considered a superspecies. All four of them are endemic to islands in the Caribbean. The Hispaniolan species has two subspecies: the nominate C. l. longirostris and C. l. petersi.

== Description ==
The Hispaniolan lizard cuckoo is 41 to 46 cm (16 to 18 in) long, about half of which is the tail. Males weigh about 83 to 99 g (2.9 to 3.5 oz) and females about 92 to 128 g (3.2 to 4.5 oz). Both subspecies have a long straight bill with a black maxilla and a paler mandible. The sexes within a subspecies have the same plumage. Adults of the nominate subspecies have entirely gray upperparts. Their wings are chestnut with a rufous patch. Their throat is rufous, the breast pale gray, and the belly rufous. Their tail is black, and the underside of the feathers have large white tips. Their eye is surrounded by bare red skin. Juveniles have brownish gray upperparts, a whitish throat, and a narrower brown tail with buff tips. The subspecies C. l. petersi is paler overall than the nominate, and has a whitish throat.

== Distribution and habitat ==
The nominate subspecies of Hispaniolan lizard cuckoo is found on the main island of Hispaniola and the offshore islands of Tortuga and Saona. C. l. petersi is found only on Gonâve Island off western Haiti. The species inhabits tropical deciduous and evergreen forests, more open woodland, thickets, mountain slopes with bushes, plantations, and gardens. In elevation, it ranges from sea level to 2,200 m (7,200 ft).

== Behavior ==
=== Movement ===
The Hispaniolan lizard cuckoo is a year-round resident throughout the island.

=== Feeding ===
The Hispaniolan lizard cuckoo usually forages from the middle to upper levels of the forest, though it also hunts near the ground. It hunts by walking along and among branches. Its diet includes lizards, small snakes, and many types of adult and larval insects. It sometimes joins mixed-species feeding flocks.

=== Breeding ===
The Hispaniolan lizard cuckoo's core breeding season is March to June. It makes a flat platform nest of leaves placed on a stump or in a tree. The clutch size is two or three eggs. No other details of its breeding phenology are known.

=== Vocalization ===
The Hispaniolan lizard cuckoo's principal call is "[r]attling, grating...in descending series". It also makes calls described as "a harsh 'tchk', a click, and a 'tick cwuh-h-h'."

== Status ==
The IUCN has assessed the Hispaniolan lizard cuckoo as being of Least Concern, though its population size is not known and is believed to be decreasing. No immediate threats have been identified. It is generally widespread, but locally scarce in parts of Haiti. In rural areas, it is hunted as a traditional medicine digestive aid.
