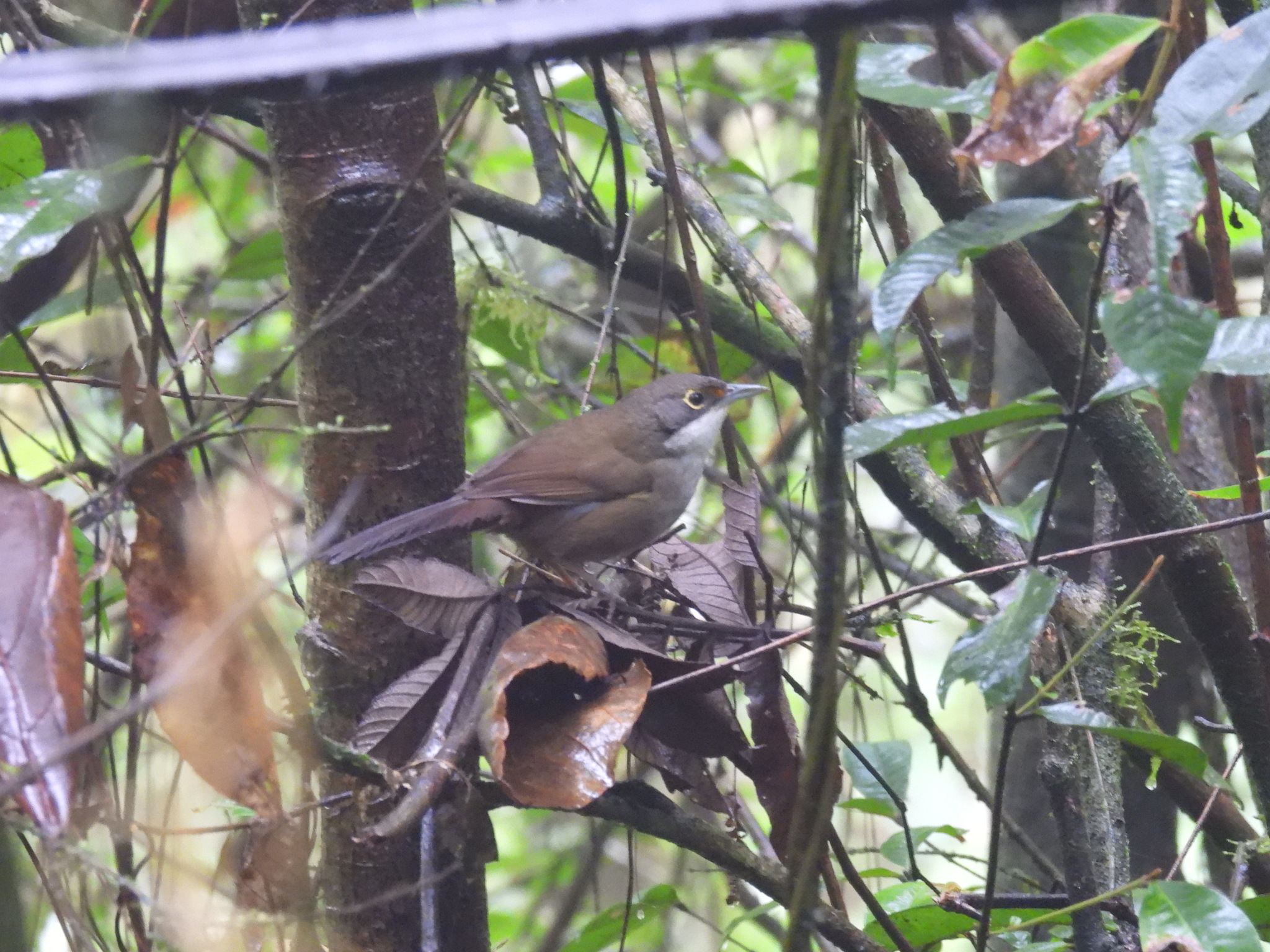

Conservation status
- Near Threatened (IUCN 3.1)

Scientific classification
- Kingdom: Animalia
- Phylum: Chordata
- Class: Aves
- Order: Passeriformes
- Family: Calyptophilidae
- Genus: Calyptophilus
- Species: C. frugivorus

Binomial name
- Calyptophilus frugivorus (Cory, 1883)

= Eastern chat-tanager =

Species of bird endemic to the Dominican Republic

The eastern chat-tanager (Calyptophilus frugivorus) is a Near Threatened species of passerine bird belonging to the family Calyptophilidae. It is endemic to the island of Hispaniola, in the Dominican Republic; it is possibly extirpated from Haiti.

== Taxonomy and systematics ==
The eastern chat-tanager has three subspecies, the nominate C. f. frugivorus, C. f. neibae, and C. f. abbotti. Of these, only C. f. neibae is confirmed extant; the other two are considered extinct. It shares its genus with the western chat-tanager (C. tertius), which was previously treated as a fourth subspecies. The genus was long included in family Thraupidae, the "true" tanagers, but it was moved in 2017.

== Description ==
The eastern chat-tanager is 17 to 19 cm (6.7 to 7.5 in) long and weighs about 26 to 39 g (0.92 to 1.4 oz). It has a long bill and a long tail so it somewhat resembles a mockingbird's shape. The sexes have the same plumage. Adults of the nominate subspecies have a dusky brown crown and a mostly dark grayish brown face with a yellow line between the bill and eye and a yellow ring around the eye. Their upperparts are dark olive-brown. Their throat and underparts are white with a heavy wash of grayish brown on the flanks and lower belly. Subspecies C. f. neibae is smaller and darker than the nominate and has a reddish tail. C. f. abbotti is slightly smaller and a more grayish brown than the nominate.

== Distribution and habitat ==
The nominate subspecies of the eastern chat-tanager, C. f. frugivorus, occurred on the Samaná Peninsula on the northeast coast of the Dominican Republic but is considered extinct, with no records since the early 1980s. The subspecies C. f. neibae is found in the central Sierra de Neiba mountain range of the western Dominican Dominican Republic and possibly into Haiti. C. f. abbotti was found on Gonâve Island off the west coast of Haiti but is also believed to be extinct since the early 1980s; however, a lack of extensive surveys on the island means the subspecies potentially survives.

In the Dominican Republic, the species inhabits dense undergrowth in montane forest, especially in ravines and along streams. C. f. frugivorus was mostly found below 600 m (2,000 ft) but C. f. neibae can range up to or above 2,000 m (6,600 ft). C. f. abbotti's habitat on Gonâve was semi-arid scrublands near sea level.

== Behavior ==
=== Movement ===
The eastern chat-tanager is a year-round resident throughout its range. It is secretive and usually encountered on or near the ground.

=== Feeding ===
The eastern chat-tanager forages on or near the ground, usually in pairs. Its diet is mostly insects and other invertebrates with a small amount of fruit.

=== Breeding ===
The eastern chat-tanager's breeding season is thought to be May to July. Almost nothing is known about its breeding biology. Only one nest has been found; it was cup shaped, placed in a fern by a blackberry Rubus patch, and contained one egg.

=== Vocalization ===
Both sexes of the eastern chat-tanager sing, usually at dawn. The species is "regarded as among the finest [singers] on Hispaniola". The nominate subspecies' song is "a low slurred or whistled 'swerp, swerp, chip, chip, chip...'" and that of C. f. neibae is "weet-weet-werp chip-cheep-sweet...". Both make "a sharp 'chin chin chin'" call.

== Status ==
The IUCN has assessed the eastern chat-tanager as Near Threatened. It has a moderate sized range and its estimated population of 10,000 to 16,700 mature individuals is believed to be decreasing. The main threats are logging and conversion of habitat to agriculture. It is considered rare to locally common, but " relatively little of the species' habitat lies within protected areas".
