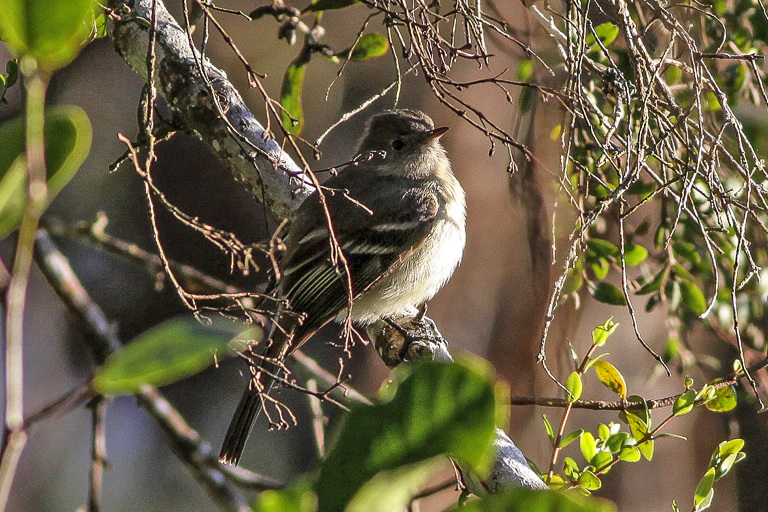

Conservation status
- Least Concern (IUCN 3.1)

Scientific classification
- Kingdom: Animalia
- Phylum: Chordata
- Class: Aves
- Order: Passeriformes
- Family: Tyrannidae
- Genus: Elaenia
- Species: E. cherriei

Binomial name
- Elaenia cherriei Cory, 1895

= Hispaniolan elaenia =

Species of bird

Hispaniolan elaenia (Elaenia cherriei) is a passerine bird in the family Tyrannidae, the tyrant flycatchers. It is endemic to the island of Hispaniola which is composed of the countries of Haiti and the Dominican Republic.

== Taxonomy ==
It was first described by American ornithologist Charles B. Cory as a new species in 1895 from a male holotype collected by George K. Cherrie. In the early 20th century it was lumped into the Greater Antillean elaenia as one of two subspecies along with the Blue Mountains elaenia of Jamaica. In 2025 it was split by the IOC and Clements Checklist owing to DNA evidence, subtle physical differences between the two species and more substantial vocal differences. It is considered monotypic.
