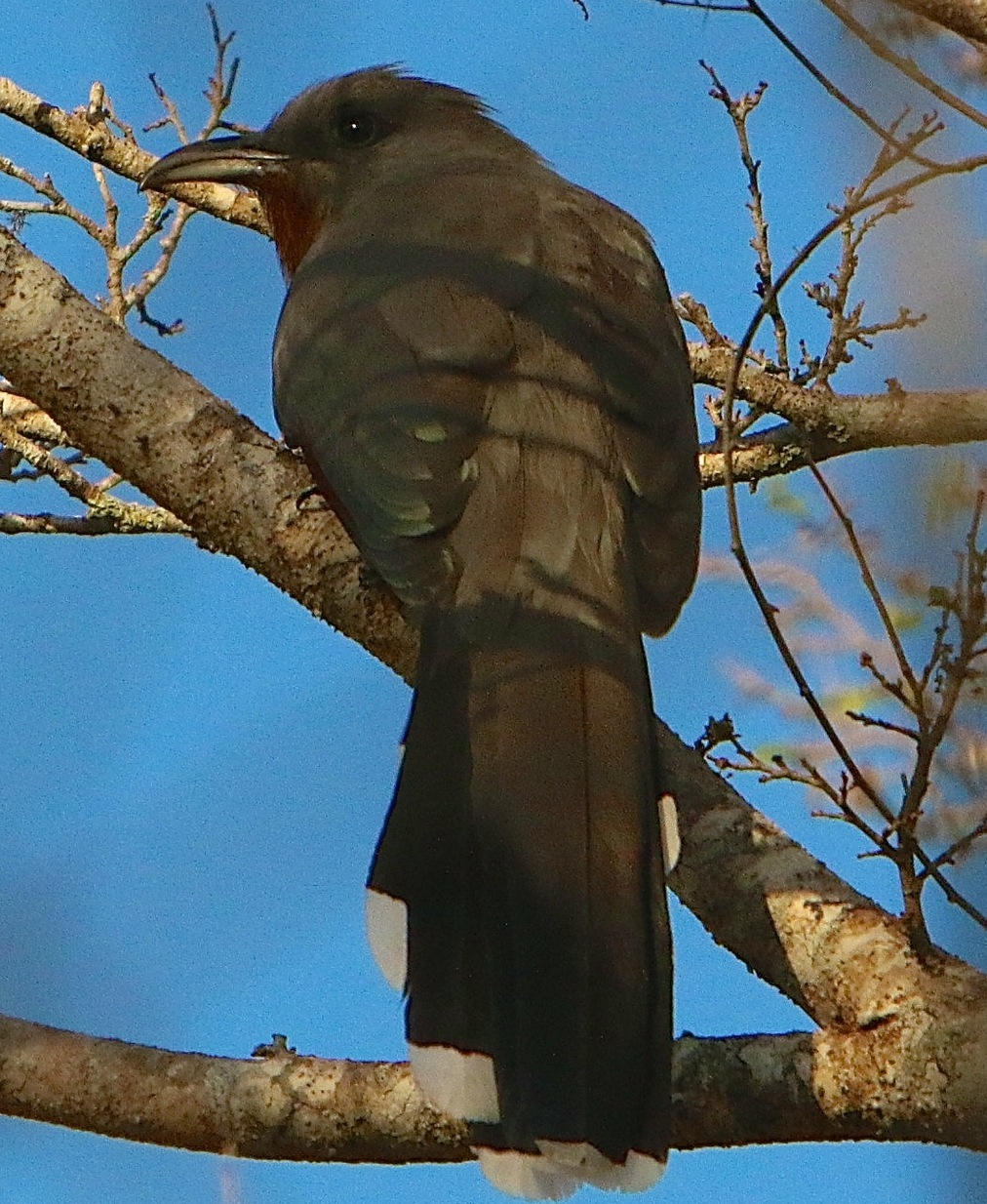
- In the Dominican Republic

Conservation status
- Endangered (IUCN 3.1)

Scientific classification
- Kingdom: Animalia
- Phylum: Chordata
- Class: Aves
- Order: Cuculiformes
- Family: Cuculidae
- Genus: Coccyzus
- Species: C. rufigularis

Binomial name
- Coccyzus rufigularis Hartlaub, 1852

Synonyms
- Hyetornis rufigularis

= Bay-breasted cuckoo =

Species of bird

The bay-breasted cuckoo (Coccyzus rufigularis) is an Endangered species of bird in the tribe Phaenicophaeini, subfamily Cuculinae of the cuckoo family Cuculidae. It is endemic to the Dominican Republic on the Caribbean island of Hispaniola; it is possibly extirpated in Haiti.

== Taxonomy and systematics ==
The bay-breasted cuckoo was at one time placed in the genus Piaya which was later merged into Hyetornis. That genus was then merged into the current Coccyzus. The species is monotypic.

It is locally known as "cúa" in Spanish and "tako kabrit" in Haitian Creole.

== Description ==
The bay-breasted cuckoo is 46 to 51 cm (18 to 20 in) long, about half of which is the tail. One male specimen weighed 128 g (4.5 oz). The species' bill is stout and decurved, with a black maxilla and a yellow mandible. Males and females have the same plumage. Adults have gray upperparts with chestnut on the wing's primaries, a gray face, a dark chestnut chin and breast, a pale rufous belly, and gray undertail coverts. Their tail is black with large white tips. Juveniles apparently differ from adults only in having narrower tail feathers.

== Distribution and habitat ==
The bay-breasted cuckoo historically ranged widely in both the Dominican Republic and Haiti. As of 2020, it had possibly been extirpated from mainland Haiti and definitely from Gonâve Island, and was known to nest in only two areas of the Dominican Republic. One is on the northern slope of Sierra de Bahoruco in Independencia Province where it is present in two protected areas. The other is in Nalga de Maco National Park on the lower southern slope of the Cordillera Central. Local reports, sight records, and photographs from other sites since 2005 hint that the species is present outside those two areas, and "it is likely that small breeding populations remain at these sites."

The bay-breasted cuckoo inhabits lowlands and foothills up to at least 900 m (3,000 ft). It is found in several forest types, but mostly in the narrow transition zone between dry and moist areas.

== Behavior ==
=== Movement ===
The bay-breasted cuckoo is not migratory.

=== Feeding ===
The bay-breasted cuckoo has a varied diet that includes adult insects, caterpillars, grubs, lizards, and mice. Young birds are mostly fed cicadas. It forages mostly from the forest mid-story to the canopy, leaping between branches.

=== Breeding ===
The bay-breasted cuckoo's breeding phenology is almost unknown. Its breeding season is from February to the beginning of the wet season in June. It builds a loose platform nest of twigs in a tree. It usually places the nest 3 to 6 m (10 to 20 ft) above the ground and hidden in dense foliage or a bromeliad. The clutch size is two or three eggs.

=== Vocalization ===
The bay-breasted cuckoo's most distinctive vocalization is "a forceful cua, often followed by accelerating u-ak-u-ak-ak-ak-ak-ak-ak ak-ak." The first note gives the species its onomatopoeic local Dominican Republic name. It also "bleats like a lamb" and makes a "[g]uttural crow-like call, described as 'ú-wack-ú-wack-ú-wack-'."

== Status ==
The IUCN has assessed the bay-breasted cuckoo as Endangered. Its population has dramatically declined since 1900 to the 2020 estimate of 300 to 2900 mature individuals, and the decrease is believed to be continuing. It is found in four protected areas, but is rare in all of them. The shrinking of its range and population are attributed to deforestation for agriculture and charcoal production, degradation of habitat by grazing, subsistence hunting, and possibly agrochemical use. Climate change is expected to alter the areas' moisture regimes and both natural and human-caused fires are believed to be more likely in the future. "A thorough survey of the species is needed throughout its range."
