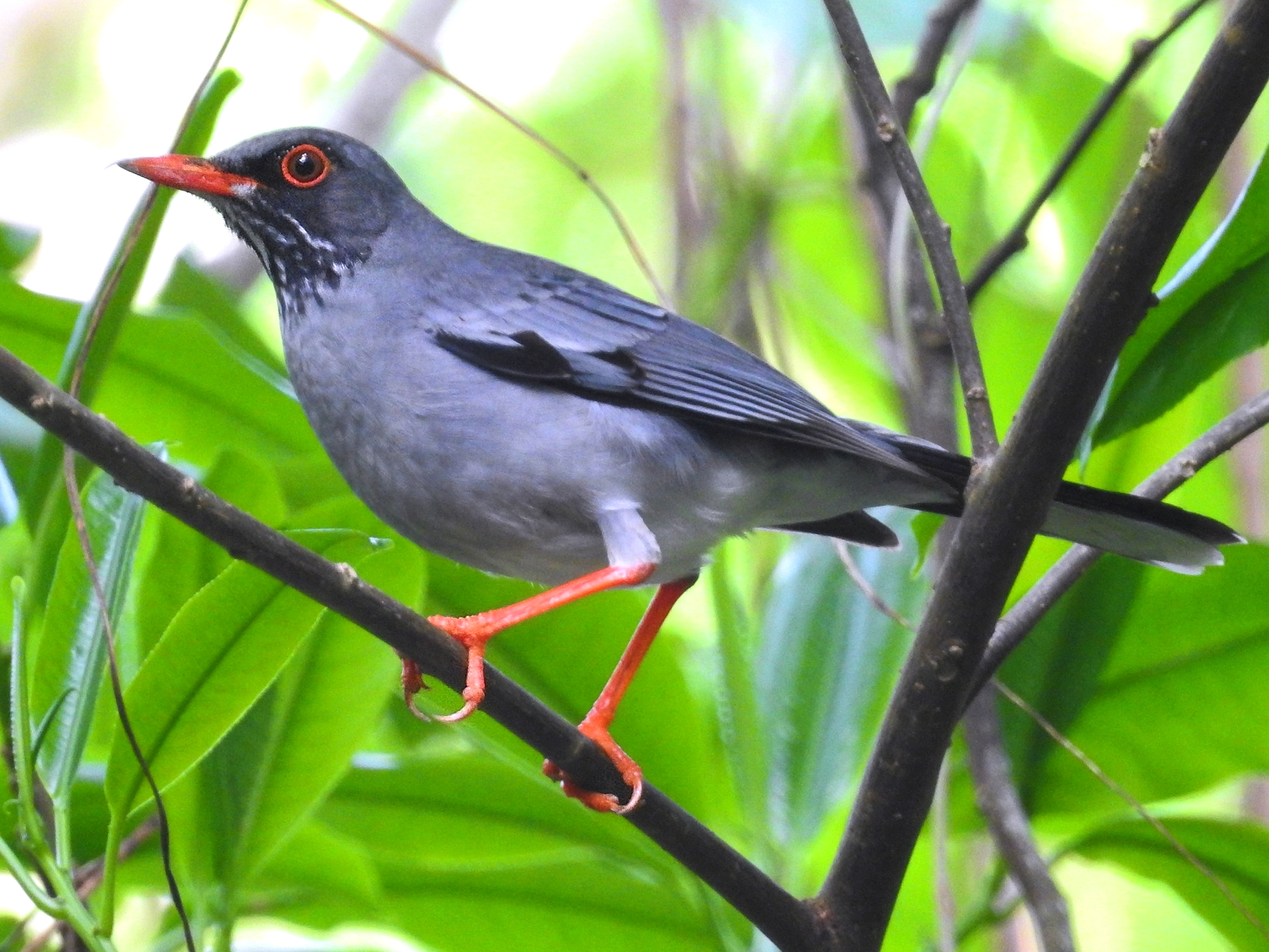
- nominate T. a. ardosiaceus in the Dominican Republic
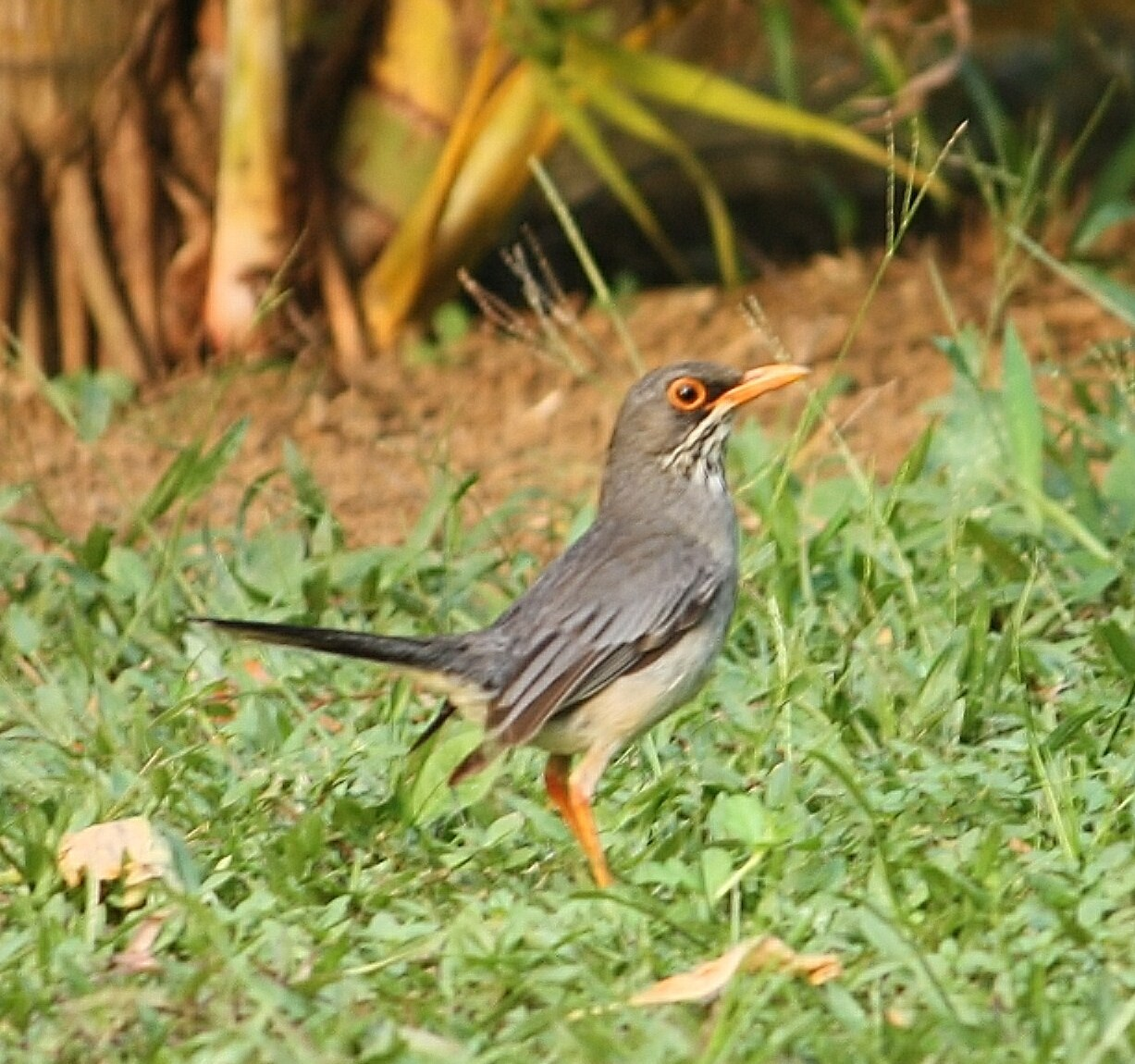
- T. a. albiventris in Dominica

Conservation status
- Least Concern (IUCN 3.1)

Scientific classification
- Kingdom: Animalia
- Phylum: Chordata
- Class: Aves
- Order: Passeriformes
- Family: Turdidae
- Genus: Turdus
- Species: T. ardosiaceus

Binomial name
- Turdus ardosiaceus Vieillot, 1822

= Eastern red-legged thrush =

Species of bird

The eastern red-legged thrush (Turdus ardosiaceus) is a species of bird in the family Turdidae. Endemic to the Caribbean, it is found on the islands of Hispaniola, Puerto Rico, and Dominica.

In Puerto Rico, it is known as zorzal de patas coloradas.

== Taxonomy ==
The eastern red-legged thrush was first described by French ornithologist Louis Pierre Vieillot in 1822 as Turdus ardosiaceus. It was later lumped as a subspecies of red-legged thrush. In 2025 the species was split in two by the AviList and Clements checklist based on differences in plumage and genetics.

Two subspecies are recognised:

- T. a. albiventris (Sclater, PL, 1889) – Dominica (Lesser Antilles)
- T. a. ardosiaceus Vieillot, LJP, 1822 – Hispaniola, including Gonâve and Tortue islands, and Puerto Rico

== Description ==
The eastern red-legged thrush is mainly slaty above and pale belly with a white and black variably striped throat. The legs, bill and eye ring are bright orange-red.

== Habitat ==
Its natural habitats are subtropical or tropical dry forests, subtropical or tropical moist lowland forests, subtropical or tropical moist montane forests, and heavily degraded former forest.

== Diet ==
Its food is mostly fruits, but a third of its diet is animal matter: insects (caterpillars, beetles, ants, crickets, wasps), plus occasional snails, frogs, lizards and birds' eggs.
