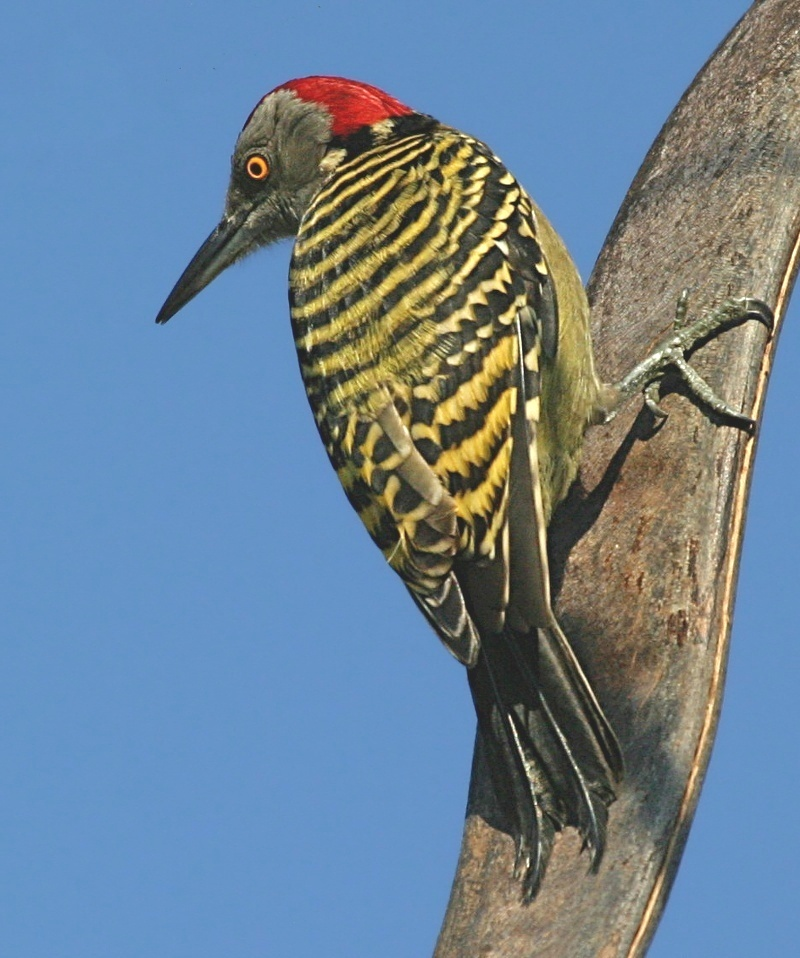
- In La Romana Province, Dominican Republic

Conservation status
- Least Concern (IUCN 3.1)

Scientific classification
- Kingdom: Animalia
- Phylum: Chordata
- Class: Aves
- Order: Piciformes
- Family: Picidae
- Genus: Melanerpes
- Species: M. striatus

Binomial name
- Melanerpes striatus (Müller, PLS, 1776)

= Hispaniolan woodpecker =

Species of bird

The Hispaniolan woodpecker (Melanerpes striatus) is a medium-sized woodpecker endemic to the Caribbean island of Hispaniola (split between the Dominican Republic and Haiti).

== Description ==
The Hispaniolan woodpecker is a gold and black barred bird growing to a length of from 22 to 28 cm (8.7 to 11.0 in). The adult male has a red crown and nape and is larger than the female, with a longer beak. The upper neck is striped black and white and the back and wings are boldly striped in black and gold. The rump is greenish-yellow, with some red on the feather tips, and the upper side of the tail is black with red upper-tail coverts. The underside of the wings is greyish-brown with pale spotting and barring, and the underside of the tail is grey or olive. The fore-crown is grey or buff, the face and throat are grey and the underparts are buff, brown or olive, with some dark streaking on the flanks. The iris is yellow, the beak is long, slender, and grey, and the legs are grey. The adult female is similar to the male but has a black crown and red nape. The juvenile has a black crown with white and red spotting, an orange nape, and dark iris.

This woodpecker is quite vocal, emitting a range of sounds including yapping, squeaking, rolling and nasal calls. Drumming is done only occasionally.

== Distribution and habitat ==
It is found in both Haiti and the Dominican Republic. It is mostly a woodland bird. Its range extends through many of Hispaniola's biomes: wet, dry, broadleaf, and coniferous forests, but also occurs in plantations, cactus scrub, mangrove areas, swamps, grasslands, palm groves, wooded agricultural areas, and urban parks.

== Ecology ==
This woodpecker forages in small noisy groups; the diet is varied and includes insects, spiders, scorpions, lizards, fruit, seeds, grain and sap. It can catch flying insects in flight, and larger food items are bashed on an "anvil" to break them up.

Unlike most woodpeckers, the Hispaniolan woodpecker is a social species that takes advantage of having a large number of individual adult birds in the colony to protect a nesting bank or tree. There may be twenty pairs of birds in a colony, with several nesting in the same tree. The nests are excavated in trunks and branches, and discarded holes are reused by Hispaniolan amazons, Hispaniolan parakeets, Hispaniolan trogons, Antillean piculets, and the golden swallow.

== Foraging behavior ==
Hispaniolan woodpeckers are omnivorous, and primarily eat insects, berries, fruits, and plants. Since their source of food is in high trees, this species is rarely seen foraging on the ground; rather, they forage on the sides of tree trunks. They are known to be a crop pest in the Dominican Republic for eating from cacao plants and other fruit producing trees. They are known not to eat the seeds in the cacao plant, but the holes they create can lead to insect damage.

Nestlings also receive a diverse diet from their parents. Usually the food given is regurgitated, but parents will also give young non-regurgitated food.

Some sexual dimorphisms have been compared with the foraging habits of this species. It has been noted that males and females sometimes differ in foraging habits. Females tend to glean on small branches, while males tend to tap and probe. Evidence of differing bill size shows dimorphism between the sexes in relation to foraging practices. As stated already, it is possible that the physical mechanics that males and females present in foraging, could connect to diverging characteristics in their physiological structure.

== Visual displays ==
Displays that this species is known to exhibit are bill oriented displays, body movement, and dihedral flight. The bill displays are thought to be used as a confrontational display. This kind of display may be used to warn other individuals who are too close to a territory or nest. Body movement displays, such as the 'swinging' display are also an example of aggression or agitation. Two positively correlated displays are the 'bowing' display and dihedral flight. These displays are normally shown between a male and female. A breeding pair might greet one another at a nest using the bowing display, by moving their head and bill up and down. In flight, this glide-like pattern in the dihedral flight is also displayed when an individual's mate is present.

== Molt patterns ==
Hispaniolan woodpeckers molt in a pattern, like woodpeckers in temperate climates. They have been found to keep their primary coverts in their second molt cycle. The time in which they molt occurs during their breeding season from mid spring to mid summer. This trait is common among tropical species. Males and females both have similar molts in flight feathers, as well as in body plumage.

== Nesting ==
This species is thought to breed throughout the year; however nesting usually starts in the spring. In at least one population, breeding exhibited a defined season, lasting from March through August. These birds are very social, and up to 26 pairs will nest in a single tree. When it comes to nest construction, both the male and female will create a nest whole within a tree. The work in a pair is well evenly distributed. Once eggs are laid, both parents take part in incubation, as well as feeding once the young have hatched. The average clutch size is four or five eggs. Previous observations report cooperative breeding in this species but this behavior appears to be rare. Usually only females have been observed incubating on the same nest site.
