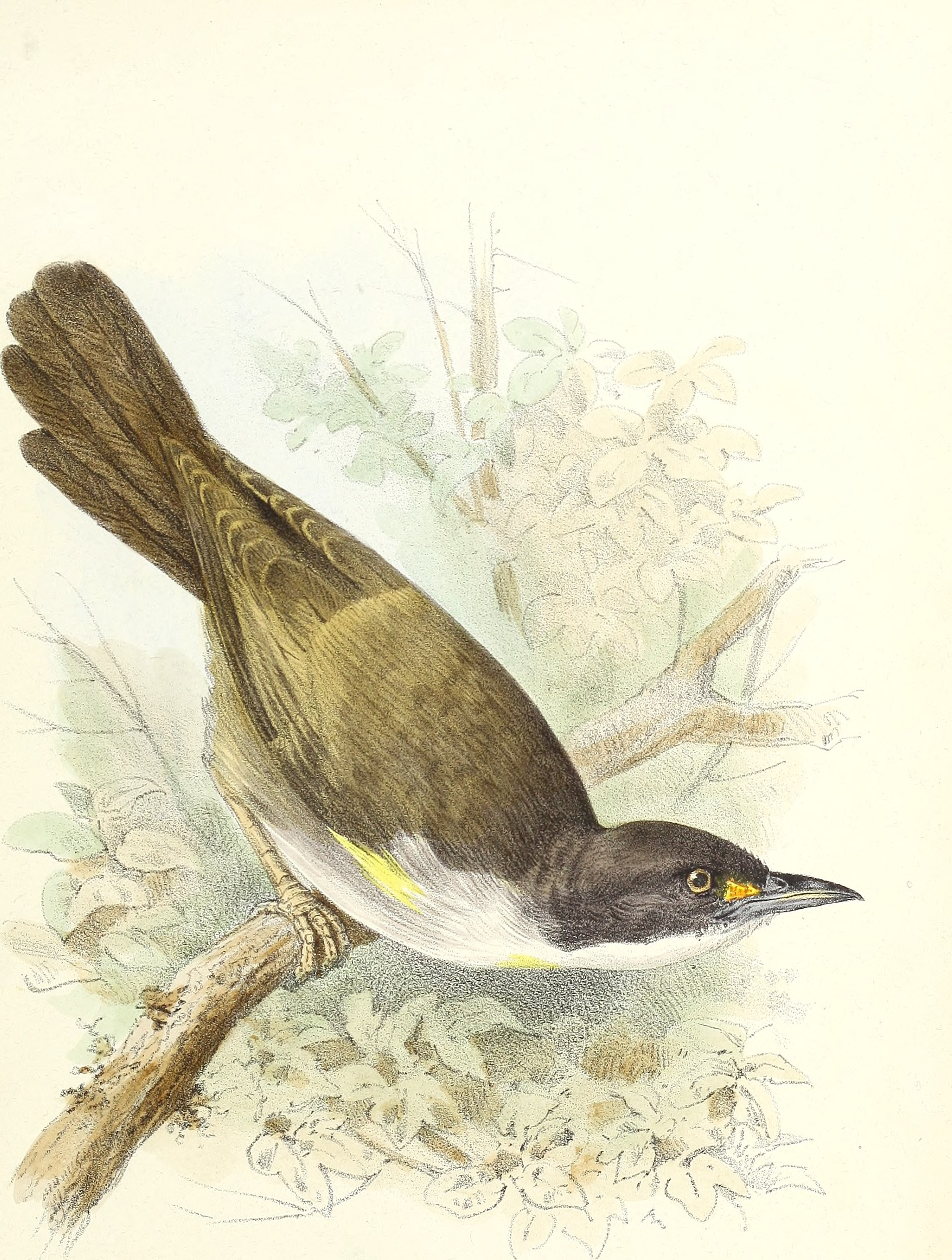
- Eastern chat-tanager (Calyptophilus frugivorus)

Scientific classification
- Kingdom: Animalia
- Phylum: Chordata
- Class: Aves
- Order: Passeriformes
- Superfamily: Emberizoidea
- Family: Calyptophilidae; Ridgway, 1907
- Genus: Calyptophilus; Cory, 1884

Type species
- Phoenicophilus frugivorus Cory, 1883

= Calyptophilus =

Genus of birds

Calyptophilus is a genus of birds that are endemic to the Caribbean island of Hispaniola.

== Taxonomy ==
The genus formerly placed in the family Thraupidae. The group was found to be distinct enough to be placed in its own family, Calyptophilidae. Established by Charles Barney Cory in 1884, it contains the following two species:

Genus Calyptophilidae – Cory, 1884 – 2 species
Common name	Scientific name and subspecies	Range	Size and ecology	IUCN status and estimated population
Western chat-tanager	Calyptophilus tertius Wetmore, 1929	Hispaniola's highest mountain ranges: Massif de la Hotte and Chaîne de la Selle in southwestern Haiti, and the adjacent Sierra de Bahoruco in the southwestern Dominican Republic	Size: 20–21 cm (7.9–8.3 in); 40–55 g (1.4–1.9 oz) Habitat: Broadleaf forest and dense brushy areas, especially in ravines and near water, at 745–2,200 m (2,400–7,200 ft) Diet: Not well known; apparently similar to eastern chat-tanager (forages on or near the ground, usually in pairs; mostly insects and other invertebrates with a small amount of fruit)	VU Decreasing; 6,700–13,300 mature individuals
Eastern chat-tanager	Calyptophilus frugivorus (Cory, 1883) Three subspecies: C. f. frugivorus (Cory, 1883): Samaná Peninsula on the northeast coast of the Dominican Republic; considered extinct, with no records since the early 1980s; C. f. neibae: Sierra de Neiba of the western Dominican Republic and possibly Haiti; only confirmed extant subspecies; C. f. abbotti: Gonâve Island off the west coast of Haiti; believed extinct since the early 1980s, though it potentially survives	Dominican Republic, in the Sierra de Neiba of the central west, possibly into Haiti; possibly extirpated from Haiti	Size: 17–19 cm (6.7–7.5 in); 26–39 g (0.92–1.4 oz) Habitat: Dense undergrowth in montane forest, especially in ravines and along streams; C. f. frugivorus mostly below 600 m (2,000 ft), C. f. neibae up to or above 2,000 m (6,600 ft), C. f. abbotti in semi-arid scrubland near sea level Diet: Forages on or near the ground, usually in pairs; mostly insects and other invertebrates with a small amount of fruit	NT Decreasing; 10,000–16,700 mature individuals

These two species were formerly considered conspecific under C. frugivorus (with the common name of chat-tanager).

The name Calyptophilus comes from the Greek words kaluptēs, meaning "hider" (derived from kaluptō, meaning "to cover") and philos, meaning "loving" (derived from phileō, meaning "to love"), referring to the birds' elusive nature.

== Genetic Connection ==
Researchers conducted a study of molecular phylogeography by utilizing a coalescent study, which resulted in all four genetic markers demonstrating substantial allele sharing within each of the two groups. This indicates that several of the now separated montane groups are suggested not to have been isolated not too long ago.
