= Hispaniolan moist forests =

Ecoregion on Hispaniola

Coordinates: 19°N 70.7°W

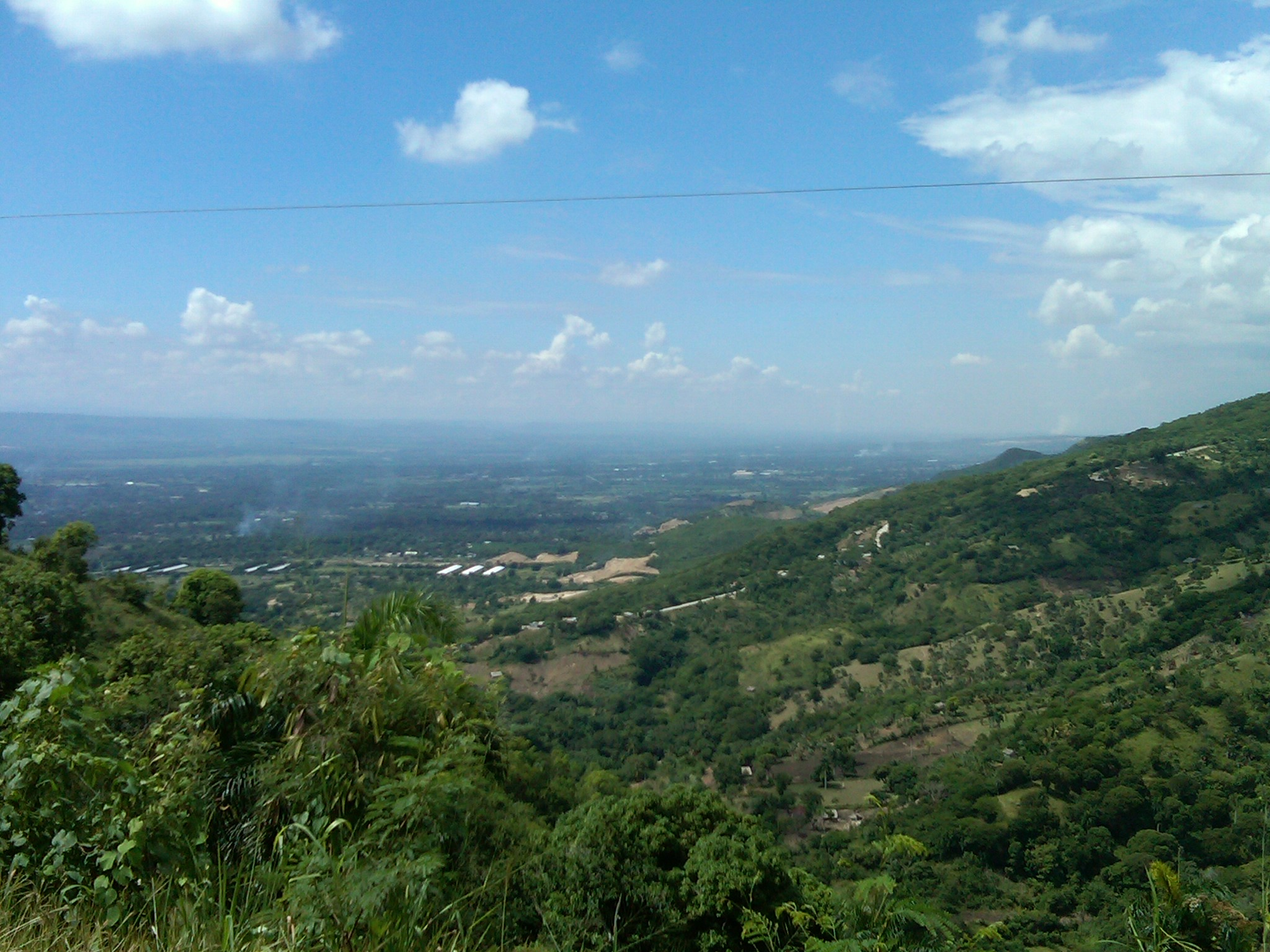
- Hills north of Santiago de los Caballeros, Dominican Republic

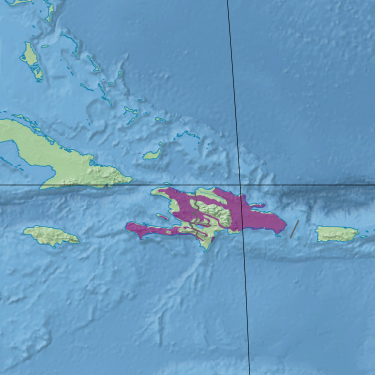
- Ecoregion territory (in purple)

Ecology
- Realm: Neotropical
- Biome: tropical and subtropical moist broadleaf forests
- Borders: Greater Antilles mangroves; Hispaniolan dry forests, Hispaniolan pine forests

Geography
- Area: 45,350 km^{2} (17,510 mi^{2})
- Countries: Dominican Republic; Haiti

Conservation
- Conservation status: Critical/endangered
- Global 200: Greater Antillean moist forests
- Protected: 3,244 km^{2} (7%)

The Hispaniolan moist forests are a tropical moist broadleaf forest ecoregion on the island of Hispaniola. They cover 46,000 km^{2} (18,000 sq mi), around 60% of the island's area.

== Geography ==
Moist forests occur on most of the eastern half the Dominican Republic, stretching from the coast all the way to high elevations in the mountains. In Haiti, they are found in the Tiburon Peninsula in the southern part of the country as well as the Massif du Nord. The drainage basins for the island's main rivers, the Yaque del Norte and Yaque del Sur, Yuna, and Artibonite, occur in this ecoregion. The forests cover diverse topography, including flatlands, valleys, plateaus, slopes and foothills up to an elevation of about 2,100 m (6,900 ft). Soils are either calcareous (neutral or somewhat alkaline) or acidic.

== Climate ==
Mesic forests receive 1,000 to 2,000 mm (39 to 79 in) of annual rainfall, while more than 4,000 mm (160 in) falls in wet forests. The rainy season lasts from April to December. Temperature varies from 23 to 24 °C (73 to 75 °F) in open areas near the coast and averages around 20 °C (68 °F) in higher areas. Freezing temperatures occur in the highest zones at certain times of the year.

== Flora ==
Variations in elevation and rainfall result in several different forest types, including lowland mesic, montane mesic, lowland wet, or montane wet.

Characteristic lowland species are Haitian catalpa (Catalpa longissima), particularly in well-drained soils, and West Indian mahogany (Swietenia mahagoni). Puerto Rican royal palm (Roystonea borinquena) is common where soil is calcareous. Paradise tree (Simarouba glauca), anón de majagua (Lonchocarpus heptaphyllus), jagua (Genipa americana), black olive (Bucida buceras), West Indian lancewood (Oxandra lanceolata) and amacey (Protium balsamiferum) are found in small secondary stands. Isolated trees are home to fustic (Maclura tinctoria), logwood (Haematoxylum campechianum), iris (Hippeastrum puniceum), caracolí (Jupunba glauca), córbano (Pseudalbizzia berteroana), West Indian elm (Guazuma ulmifolia), palo de leche (Rauvolfia nitida), and spiny fiddlewood (Citharexylum spinosum).

Areas where soils are superficial or savannas have formed from degraded forest are indicated by trees such as the sandpaper tree (Curatella americana), grandleaf seagrape (Coccoloba pubescens), Jamaican nettletree (Trema micrantha) and Tabebuia species. Cashews (Anacardium occidentale) are present in zones that have marginal earth and precipitation closer to that of the dry forests.

Yellow olivier (Buchenavia capitata), sablito (Didymopanax morototoni), maricao (Byrsonima spicata), aguacatillo (Alchornea latifolia), West Indian cherry (Prunus myrtifolia), árbol de Santa Maria (Calophyllum brasiliense), cocuyo (Hirtella triandra), American muskwood (Guarea guidonia), palo de yagua (Casearia arborea), locust (Hymenaea courbaril), balatá (Manilkara bidentata), and sierra palm (Prestoea montana) grow in mesic forests. Hispaniolan pine (Pinus occidentalis) is common on lateritic soils.

Wet forests consist of trees covered by parasitic plants and epiphytes. The principal indicator species include tree ferns (Cyathea spp.) and Chionanthus species. At higher elevations, characteristic species are the trembling schefflera (Frodinia tremula), black sapote (Diospyros revoluta), almendrón (Prunus occidentalis), Fadyen's silktassel (Garrya fadyenii), Weinmannia pinnata, Oreopanax capitatus, Brunellia comocladifolia, Hispaniolan pines, and Cyathea species.

== Fauna ==
=== Birds ===
Birds of the moist forests include the Hispaniolan amazon (Amazona ventralis), Hispaniolan parakeet (Psittacara chloropterus), Hispaniolan lizard cuckoo (Coccyzus longirostris), Hispaniolan palm crow (Corvus palmarum), American kestrel (Falco sparverius dominicensis), vervain hummingbird (Mellisuga minima vielloti), narrow-billed tody (Todus angustirostris), stolid flycatcher (Myiarchus stolidus dominicensis), Hispaniolan pewee (Contopus hispaniolensis), rufous-throated solitaire (Myadestes genibarbis montanus), Hispaniolan woodpecker (Melanerpes striatus), white-necked crow (Corvus leucognaphalus), palmchat (Dulus dominicus), Hispaniolan trogon (Priotelus roseigaster), ruddy quail-dove (Geotrygon montana montana), red-tailed hawk (Buteo jamaicensis jamaicensis), white-winged warbler (Xenoligea montana), green-tailed warbler (Microligea palustris), Antillean siskin (Spinus dominicensis), La Selle thrush (Turdus swalesi), eastern chat-tanager (Calyptophilus frugivorus), and Hispaniolan crossbill (Loxia megaplaga).

=== Mammals ===
Native mammals include the Hispaniolan hutia (Plagiodontia aedium), Hispaniolan solenodon (Solenodon paradoxus), and 18 bat species such as the Cuban flower bat (Phyllonycteris poeyi).

=== Reptiles ===
Reptiles include Marcano's galliwasp (Panolopus marcanoi) and Ialtris haetianus.

== Protected areas ==
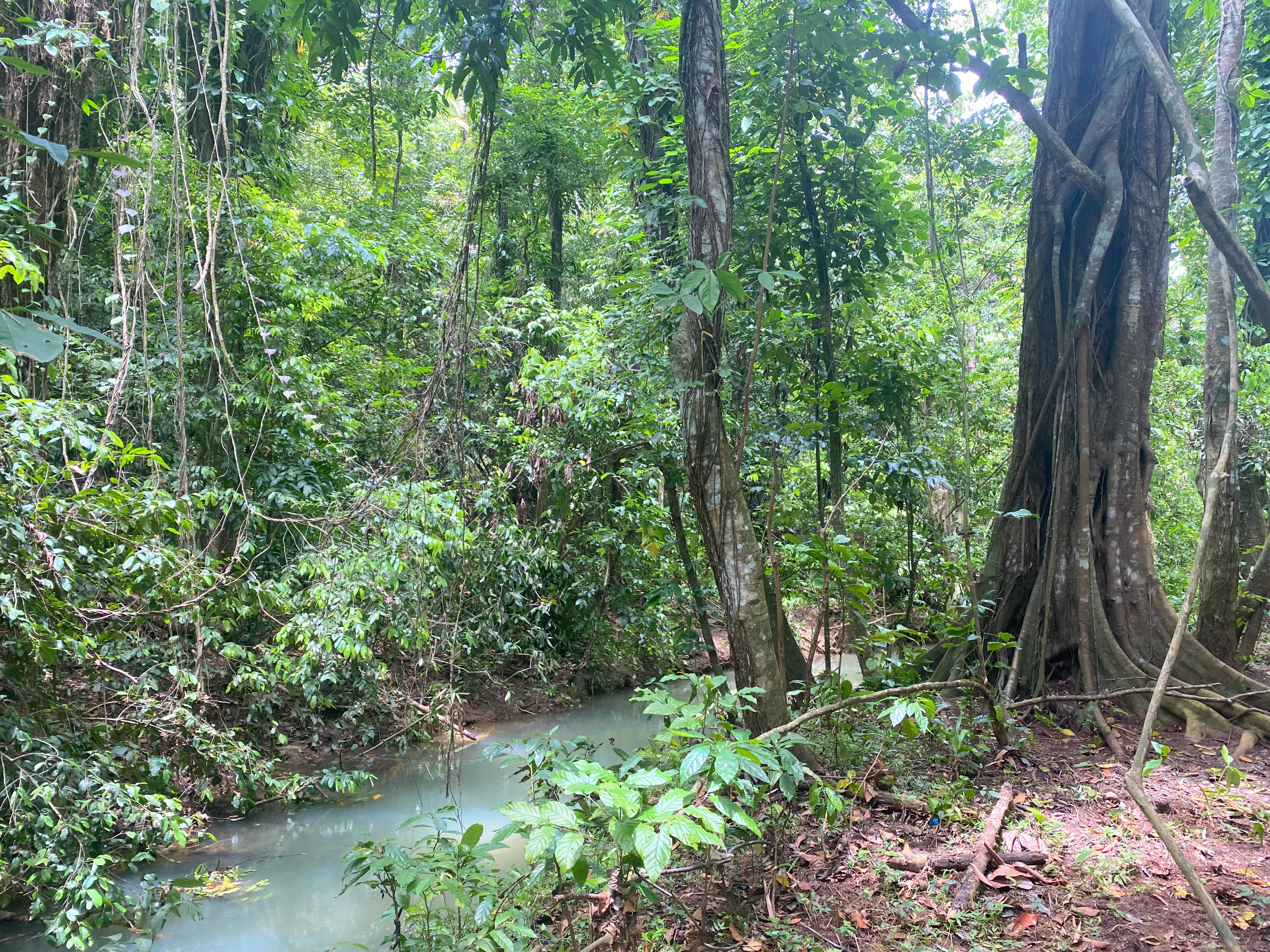
The Monumento Natural Salto El Limón

11.53% of the ecoregion is in protected areas. Protected areas include (with IUCN protected area category):

- Las Neblinas Scientific Reserve Ia
- Loma Barbacoa Scientific Reserve Ia
- Loma Guaconejo Scientific Reserve Ia
- Loma Quita Espuela Scientific Reserve Ia
- La Salcedoa Scientific Reserve Ia
- Sierra Prieta Biological Reserve Ib
- Loma Charco Azul Biological Reserve Ib
- Cotubanamá (Del Este) National Park II
- Los Haitises National Park II
- La Citadelle, Sans Souci, Ramiers National Park III
- Jaragua National Park II
- Sierra de Bahoruco National Park II
- Parc Macaya National Park II
- Zone Reservée Péligre National Park V
- Cabo Cabrón National Park II
- Humedales del Ozama National Park II
- Manglares del Bajo Yuna National Park II
- Montaña La Humeadora National Park II
- Anacaona National Park II
- Aniana Vargas National Park II
- Francisco Alberto Caamaño Deñó National Park II
- La Gran Sabana National Park II
- La Hispaniola National Park II
- Luis Quin National Park II
- Manolo Tavarez Justo National Park II
- Máximo Gómez National Park II
- Picky Lora National Park II
- Punta Espada National Park II
- Saltos de la Jalda National Park II
- Lagon des Huîtres National Park VI
- Sant d'Eau National Park III
- Forêt des Pins 2 National Park II
- Les Matheux National Park III
- Deux Mamelles National Park II
- Los Haitises Specially Protected Area (Cartagena Convention) II
- Jaragua Specially Protected Area (Cartagena Convention) II
- La Caleta Specially Protected Area (Cartagena Convention) II
- Sierra de Bahoruco Specially Protected Area (Cartagena Convention) II
- Bosque Húmedo de Río San Juan Natural Monument III
- Cabo Francés Viejo Natural Monument III
- Cabo Samaná Natural Monument III
- Cerro de San Francisco Natural Monument III
- Hoyo Claro Natural Monument III
- Isla Catalina Natural Monument III
- Lagunas Cabarete y Goleta Natural Monument III
- Las Caobas Natural Monument III
- Loma Isabel de Torres Natural Monument III
- Loma la Altagracia o Loma la Enea Natural Monument III
- Diego de Ocampo Natural Monument III
- Reserva Antropológica Cuevas de Borbón o del Pomier Natural Monument III
- Río Cumayasa y Cueva de las Maravillas Natural Monument III
- Salto de La Damajagua Natural Monument III
- Salto El Limón Natural Monument III
- El Saltadero Natural Monument III
- La Ceiba Natural Monument III
- La Tinaja Natural Monument III
- Laguna Gri-Grí Natural Monument III
- Las Marías Natural Monument III
- Miguel Domingo Fuerte Natural Monument Wildlife Refuge III
- Punta Bayahibe Natural Monument III
- Salto de Socoa Natural Monument III
- Saltos de Jima Natural Monument III
- Salto Grande Natural Monument III
- Bahia de Luperón Wildlife Refuge IV
- Cueva de Los Tres Ojos Wildlife Refuge VI
- La Gran Laguna o Perucho Wildlife Refuge IV
- Lagunas de Bávaro y El Caletón Wildlife Refuge IV
- Laguna Saladilla Wildlife Refuge IV
- Lagunas Redonda y Limón Wildlife Refuge IV
- Manglar de la Jina Wildlife Refuge IV
- Ría Maimón Wildlife Refuge IV
- Río Chacuey Wildlife Refuge IV
- Río Soco Wildlife Refuge IV
- Cañón Río Gurabo Wildlife Refuge IV
- Gran Estero Wildlife Refuge IV
- Laguna Mallén Wildlife Refuge IV
- Laguna San José Wildlife Refuge IV
- Río Higuamo Wildlife Refuge IV
- Río Dulce Wildlife Refuge IV
- Barrero Forest Reserve V
- Cabeza de Toro Forest Reserve V
- Cayuco Forest Reserve V
- Cerro Chacuey Forest Reserve V
- Guanito Forest Reserve V
- Hatillo Forest Reserve V
- Las Matas Forest Reserve V
- Loma El 20 Forest Reserve V
- Loma Novillero Forest Reserve V
- Río Cana Forest Reserve V
- Villarpando Forest Reserve V
- Baradéres-Cayemites Managed Natural Resources Protected Area VI
- Jérémie-Abricots Managed Natural Resources Protected Area VI
- Port Salut-Aquin Managed Natural Resources Protected Area IV
- Guagui National Recreation Area VI
- Guaraguao - Punta Catuano National Recreation Area VI
- Boca de Nigua National Recreation Area V
