= Los Haitises National Park =

National park in the Dominican Republic

- IUCN category II (national park)
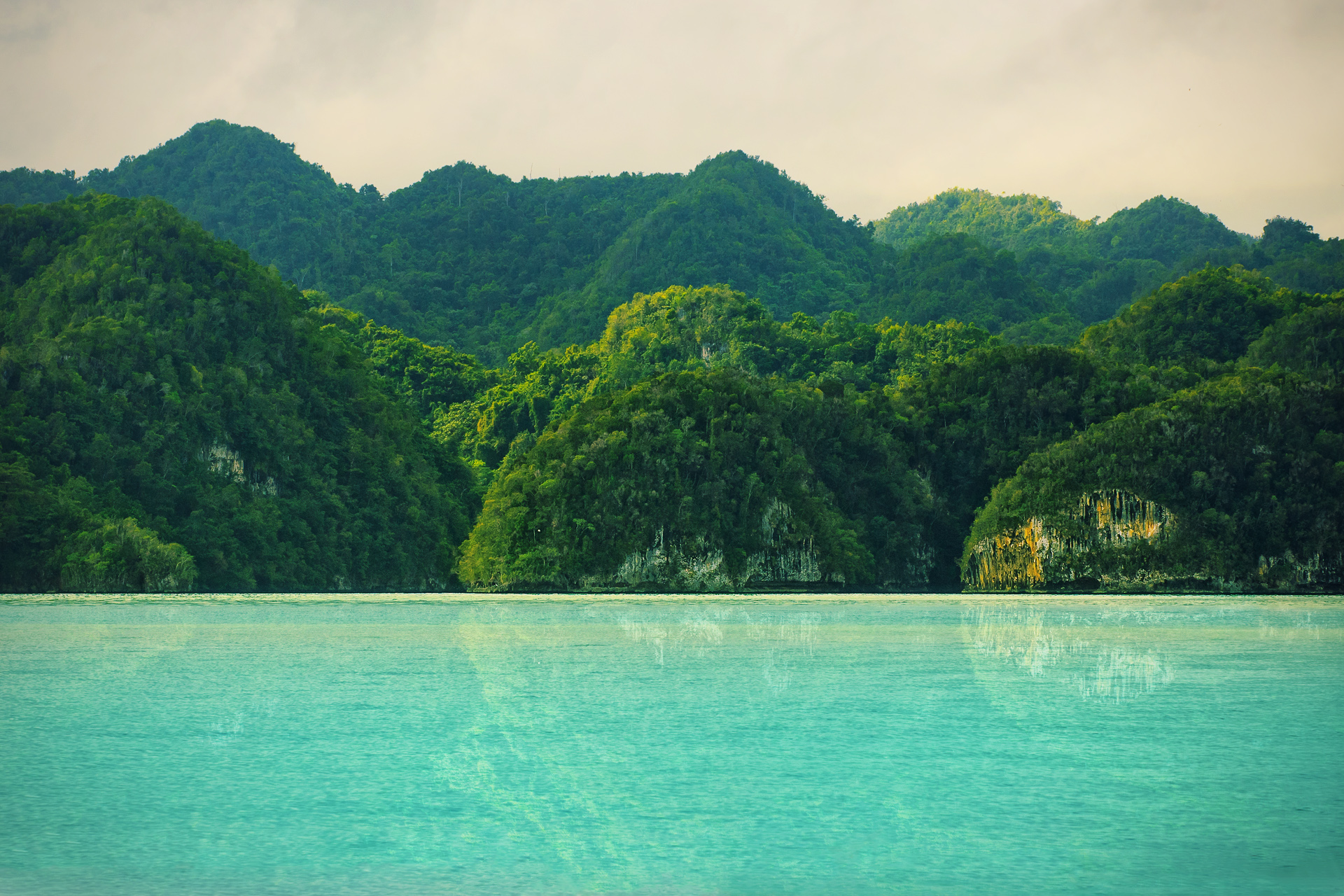
- Los Haitises National Park in Samaná as seen from San Lorenzo bay

- Location within the Dominican Republic
- Interactive map of Los Haitises National Park
- Location: Hato Mayor, Monte Plata, and Samaná, Dominican Republic
- Coordinates: 19°00′24″N 69°38′31″W
- Area: 826 km^{2} (319 sq mi)
- Established: June 3, 1976

Los Haitises National Park is a national park located on the remote northeast coast of the Dominican Republic that was established in 1976. It consists of a limestone karst plateau with conical hills, sinkholes and caverns, and there is a large area of mangrove forest on the coast. Other parts of the park are clad in subtropical humid forest and the area has an annual precipitation of about 2,000 mm (79 in). The park contains a number of different habitats and consequently has a great diversity of mammals and birds, including some rare species endemic to the island. Some of the caverns contain pictograms and petroglyphs. The park has become a popular ecotourism destination but the number of tourists allowed to visit is limited.

== History ==
The park was created by Law 409 enacted June 3, 1976. It was preceded by a Reserva Forestal (Forest Reserve) called Zona Vedada de Los Haitises (Los Haitises Prohibited Zone), created by Law 244. In 1996, its area was expanded from 208 to 826 km^{2} (80 to 319 mi^{2}) by Decree 233. Its boundary, which has been redrawn on several occasions, is uncertain. The bulk of the park is located in the municipality of Sabana de la Mar, province of Hato Mayor, while the remainder lies in the provinces of Monte Plata and Samaná. Sabana de la Mar is the site of a visitors' center.

Despite advanced deforestation, the precipitation is still considerable, ranging from 1,900–2,000 mm (75–79 in) annually. The park is near the top rank in both annual total rainfall and annual number of rainy days among sites in the Dominican Republic.

== Geology ==
The area was formed during the Miocene epoch of the Neogene period. Geomorphologically, it is a platform karst with dense clusters of conical hills of nearly uniform height (200–300 m or 660–980 ft) in between which there are many sinkholes. The maximum dimensions of this platform karst block are 82 km (51 mi) east to west (from Sabana de la Mar to Cevicos) by 26 km (16 mi) north to south (from the Samaná Bay to Bayaguana). The hills of the interior have the same origin as the islets of the Samaná Bay. There is a multitude of caverns.

Hydrographically, Los Haitises spans portions of two basins: in its western half, the lower basin of the Yuna River; and in its eastern half, a zone spanning Miches and Sabana de la Mar. The Yuna drains through two mouths: its own and that of the Barracote River. In addition to these two rivers, the park is traversed by the Payabo River, the Los Cocos River, the Naranjo River, and numerous natural channels including the Cabirma, Estero, and Prieto.

== Flora ==
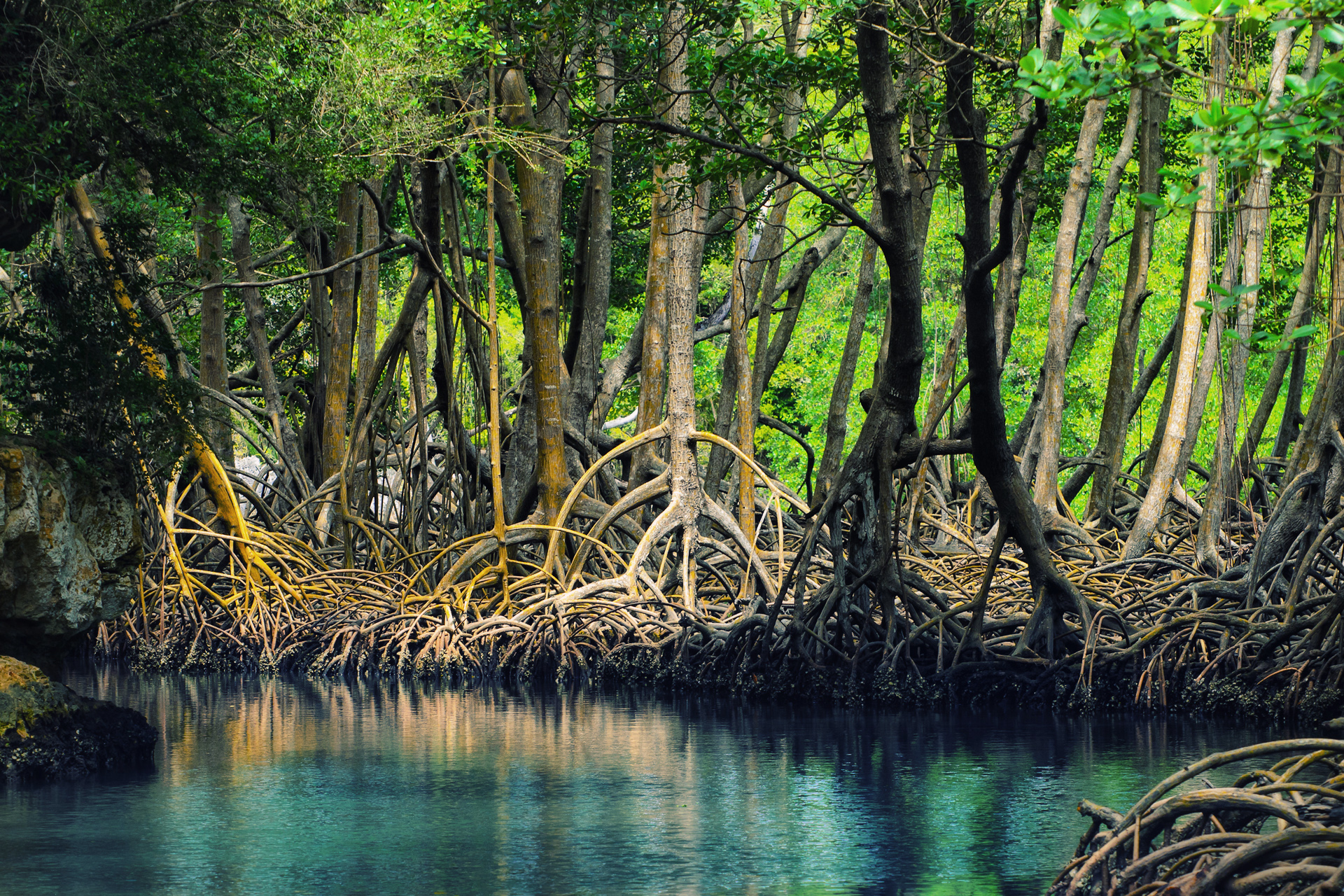
Mangroves in Los Haitises National Park

Los Haitises has two Holdridge life zones: humid subtropical forest (Bh-S) and very humid subtropical forest (Bmh-S). Broadleaf species in the park include "musk wood" (Guarea guidonia, locally cabirma santa), cigar-box cedar (Cedrela odorata), ceiba (Ceiba pentandra), West Indian mahogany (Swietenia mahagoni, Spanish caoba), cupey (Clusia rosea), and grandleaf seagrape (Coccoloba pubescens). There are many species of orchids. Los Haitises contains the greatest abundance of Caribbean mangrove, in which species like red mangrove (Rhizophora mangle) and white mangrove (Laguncularia racemosa) predominate.

== Fauna ==
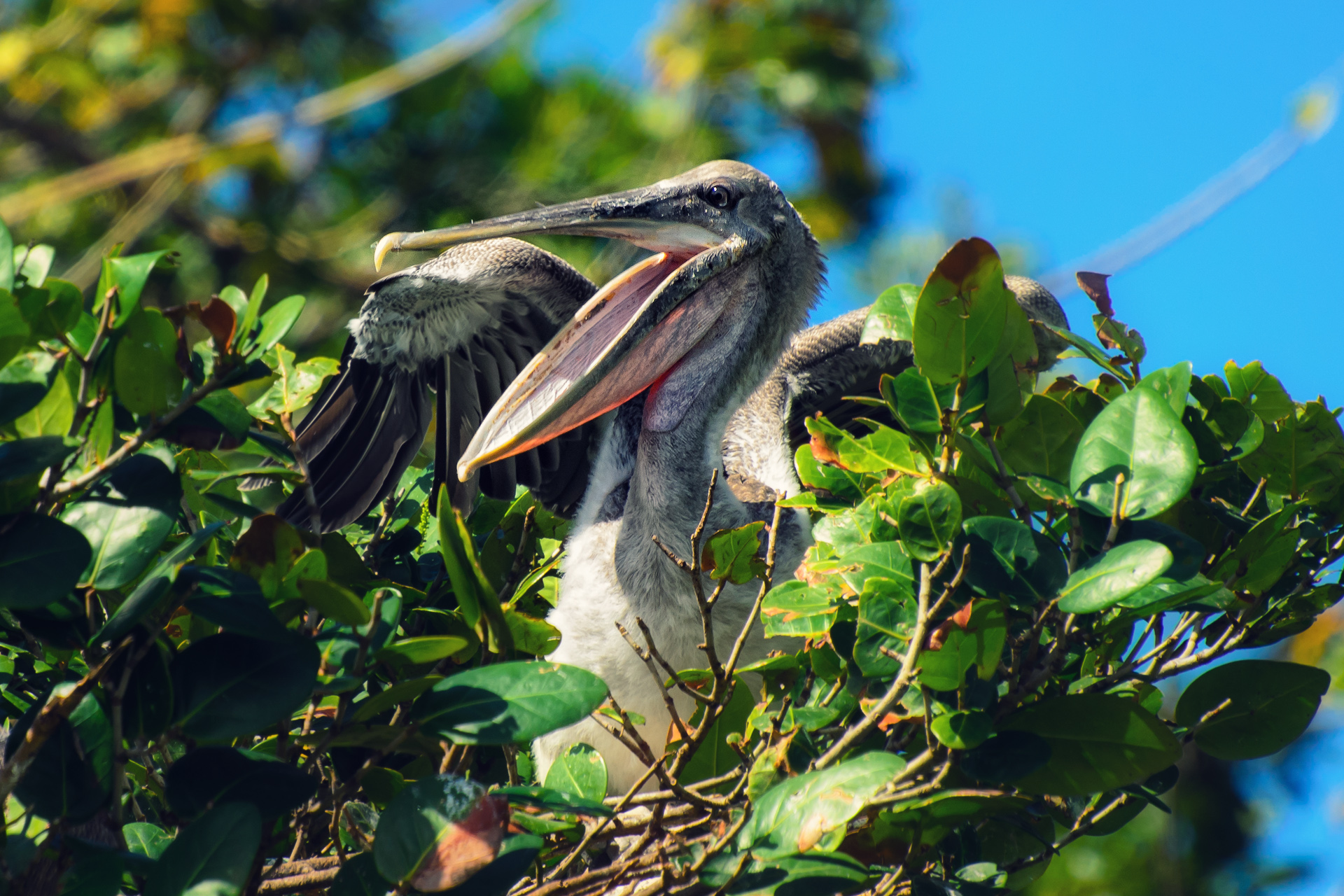
Pelican in the nest on one of Los Haitises islands

The fauna of Los Haitises is of great variety, and due to the park's diversity of physical geographic zones, it has the greatest diversity of fauna among the protected natural areas in the country. Two endemic mammal species, the Hispaniolan hutia (Plagiodontia aedium) and the Hispaniolan solenodon (Solenodon paradoxus), are threatened with extinction.

Being a coastal and marine park, it contains a large variety of birds, including most of the species endemic to the country. These include the brown pelican or alcatraz (Pelecanus occidentalis), magnificent frigatebird (Fregata magnificens), Hispaniolan amazon (Amazona ventralis), barn owl (Tyto alba), and stygian owl (Asio stygius). The largest population in the world of the endemic Ridgway's hawk (Buteo ridgwayi) is in the park.

== Tourism ==
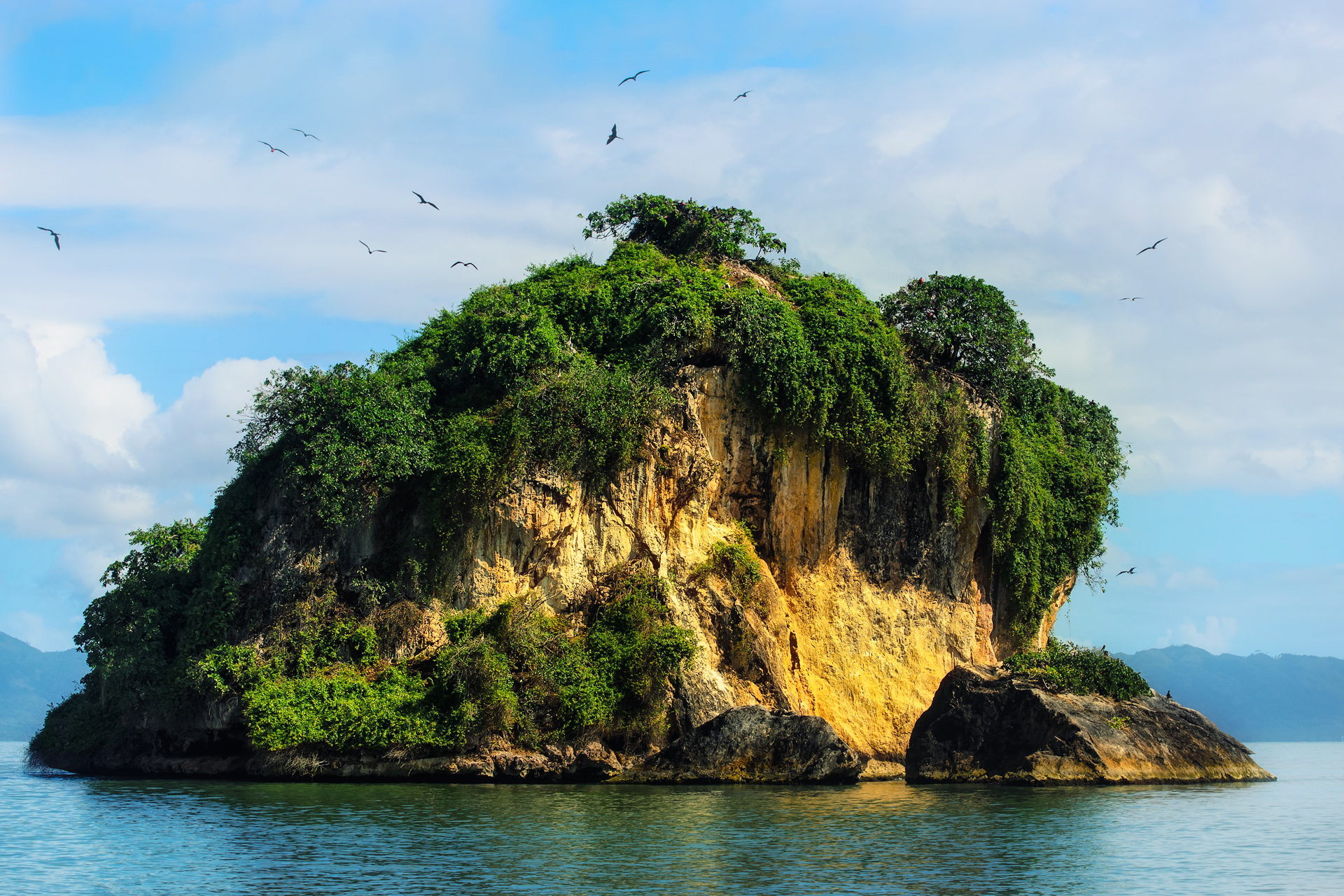
Nesting birds island in San Lorenzo bay

Los Haitises National Park is a protected virgin forest with little road access. The number of tourists allowed is limited, but since 2000 it has been a relatively popular destination for ecotourism using ecological guides from Sabana de La Mar. Haiti (singular) means highland or mountain range in the Taíno language, although the elevation of the park's hills ranges from 30–40 m (98–131 ft). There is a multitude of caverns created by water erosion. Native Americans adorned these caverns with pictographs and petroglyphs. The culture or cultures which created these artworks remain unidentified, some of them possibly predating the Taínos.

Los Haitises National Park contains spectacular landscapes like the San Lorenzo Bay, the islets (keys), and the mangroves. The Cayo de los Pájaros ("bird key"), which is conspicuous for the virtually continuous presence of frigatebirds and pelicans circling low overhead, sits between the Boca del Infierno ("Mouth of Hell") and El Naranjo Arriba. Cupey is the dominant tree species and birds fill its horizontal branches. The wild banyantree (Ficus citrifolia, also known as shortleaf fig) and tropical almond (Terminalia catappa) are the other park trees.

Most visitors arrive by sea embarking from Sabana de la Mar (east end), Sánchez (north end), or Samaná (across Samaná Bay to Sabana de la Mar center); however, it is possible to arrive by land from the south using four-wheel drive vehicles. A private highway is being constructed through the mountains and a new airport is being built in the city of Samaná to provide better access. The main economic activities in Monte Plata Province are cattle ranching and sugarcane farming. Tourists will find a large number of roads for sugarcane transport.
