= C. pubescens =

C. pubescens may refer to:

- Capsicum pubescens, a plant species found in Central and South America
- Coccoloba pubescens, the grandleaf seagrape or Eve's umbrella, a plant species native to coastal regions of the Caribbean
- Crataegus pubescens (disambiguation)
- Cypripedium pubescens, the large yellow lady's slipper, yellow moccasin-flower, nerveroot, Noah's ark, American valerian or Whippoorwill's-shoe, an orchid species native to North America
