= Guarea caulobotrys =

Conservation status
- Vulnerable (IUCN 2.3)

Scientific classification
- Kingdom: Plantae
- Clade: Tracheophytes
- Clade: Angiosperms
- Clade: Eudicots
- Clade: Rosids
- Order: Sapindales
- Family: Meliaceae
- Genus: Guarea
- Species: G. caulobotrys

Binomial name
- Guarea caulobotrys Cuatrec.

Synonyms
- Guarea caulobotryis Cuatrec. 1950, orth. var.

Species of flowering plant

Guarea caulobotrys is a species of plant in the family Meliaceae. It is endemic to Colombia.

== Taxonomy ==
The species was first described by José Cuatrecasas in 1950. Cuatrecasas spelt the epithet caulobotryis. However, -botrys used in a scientific name is a noun, so its ending does not change. As of October 2021, the International Plant Names Index used the spelling caulobotrys, noting the different initial spelling. This approach was followed by Tropicos and the International Union for Conservation of Nature, among others. The original spelling was also used.
