= Guarea crispa =

Conservation status
- Endangered (IUCN 3.1)

Scientific classification
- Kingdom: Plantae
- Clade: Tracheophytes
- Clade: Angiosperms
- Clade: Eudicots
- Clade: Rosids
- Order: Sapindales
- Family: Meliaceae
- Genus: Guarea
- Species: G. crispa

Binomial name
- Guarea crispa T.D.Penn.

Species of flowering plant

Guarea crispa is a species of flowering plant in the family Meliaceae. It is a tree endemic to Amazonas state in northern Brazil. It grows in lowland terre firme Amazon rainforest. It is threatened by habitat loss.
