= Polytela cliens =

Scientific classification
- Kingdom: Animalia
- Phylum: Arthropoda
- Class: Insecta
- Order: Lepidoptera
- Superfamily: Noctuoidea
- Family: Noctuidae
- Genus: Polytela
- Species: P. cliens

Binomial name
- Polytela cliens (Felder & Rogenhofer, 1874)

Synonyms
- Euphasia cliens Felder & Rogenhofer, 1874; Glottula orientalis Hampson, 1894; Polytela cliens aethiopica Sheljuzhko, 1960; Polytela cliens tanit Rungs, 1972

Species of moth

Polytela cliens is a species of moth of the family Noctuidae. It is found through North Africa and the Sahara to Israel, Jordan, the Arabian Peninsula and to southern Iran.

Adults are on wing from February to March. There is one generation per year. Part of the pupae diapause up to several years.

Recorded food plants include Dipcadi serotinum and Pancratium tortuosum.
