= Guarea cristata =

Conservation status
- Vulnerable (IUCN 2.3)

Scientific classification
- Kingdom: Plantae
- Clade: Tracheophytes
- Clade: Angiosperms
- Clade: Eudicots
- Clade: Rosids
- Order: Sapindales
- Family: Meliaceae
- Genus: Guarea
- Species: G. cristata

Binomial name
- Guarea cristata Pennington

Species of flowering plant

Guarea cristata is a species of plant in the family Meliaceae. It is found in Brazil and Peru.
