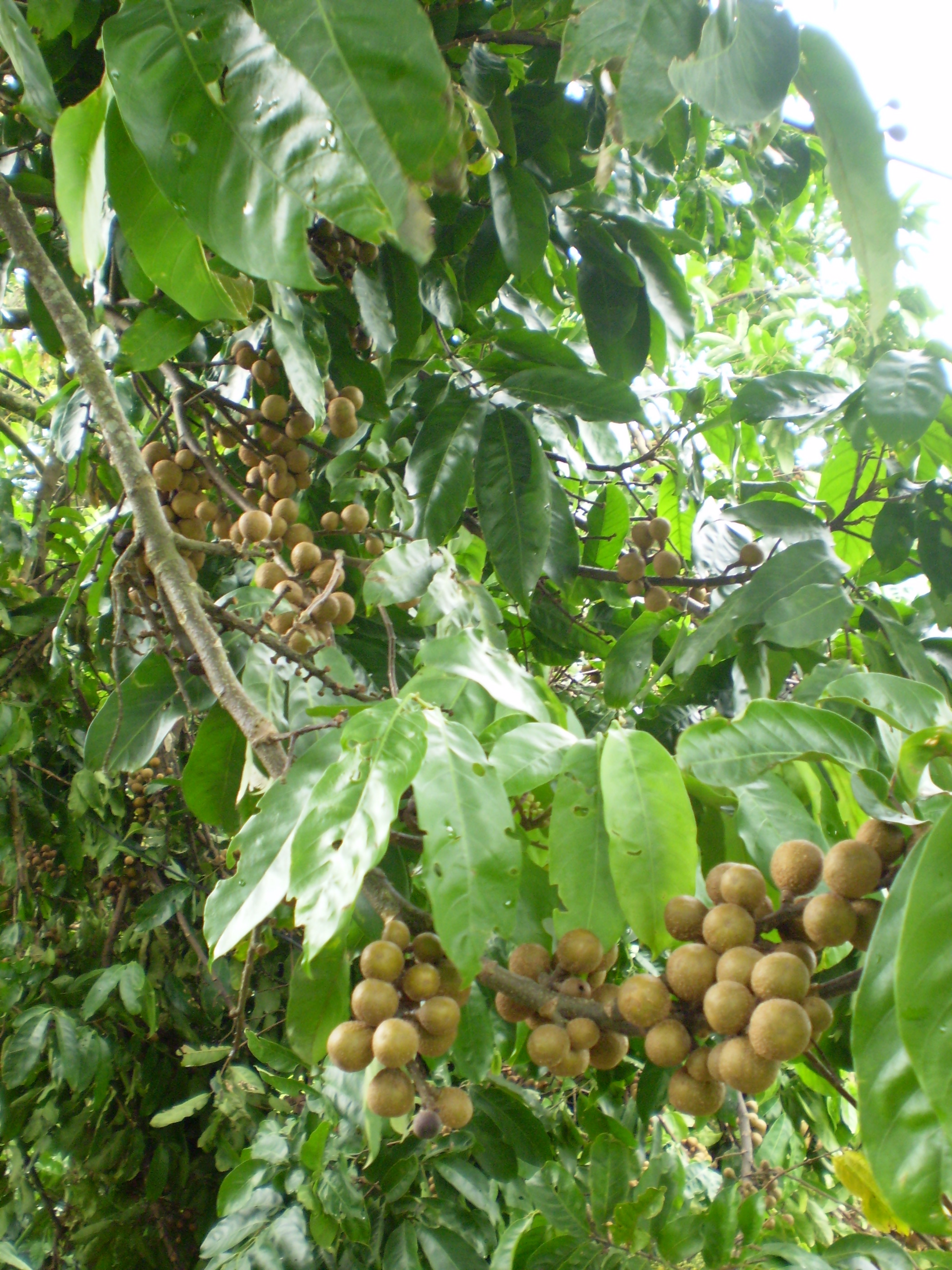
- Guarea guidonia

Scientific classification
- Kingdom: Plantae
- Clade: Tracheophytes
- Clade: Angiosperms
- Clade: Eudicots
- Clade: Rosids
- Order: Sapindales
- Family: Meliaceae
- Subfamily: Melioideae
- Genus: Guarea; F. Allam ex L.

Species
- See text

= Guarea =

Genus of plants

Guarea is a genus of evergreen trees or shrubs in the family Meliaceae, native to tropical Africa and Central and South America. At their largest, they are large trees 20–45 m tall, with a trunk over 1 m diameter, often buttressed at the base. The leaves are pinnate, with 4–6 pairs of leaflets, the terminal leaflet present. They are dioecious, with male and female flowers on separate plants. The flowers are produced in loose inflorescences, each flower small, with 4–5 yellowish petals. The fruit is a four or five-valved capsule, containing several seeds, each surrounded by a yellow-orange fleshy aril; the seeds are dispersed by hornbills and monkeys which eat the aril.

== Species ==
Species accepted by Plants of the World Online as of March 2019:

- Guarea aguilarii Al.Rodr.
- Guarea anomala T.D.Penn.
- Guarea bijuga C.DC.
- Guarea blanchetii C.DC.
- Guarea bullata Radlk.
- Guarea carapoides Harms
- Guarea carinata Ducke
- Guarea cartaguenya Cuatrec.
- Guarea casimiriana Harms
- Guarea caulobotrys Cuatrec. (also spelt caulobotryis)
- Guarea chiricana Standl.
- Guarea cinnamomea Harms
- Guarea constricta Al.Rodr.
- Guarea convergens T.D.Penn.
- Guarea corrugata Cuatrec.
- Guarea corticosa Al.Rodr.
- Guarea costata A.Juss.
- Guarea crispa T.D.Penn.
- Guarea cristata T.D.Penn.
- Guarea donnell-smithii C.DC.
- Guarea ecuadoriensis W.Palacios
- Guarea eriorhachis Harms
- Guarea fissicalyx Harms
- Guarea fistulosa W.Palacios
- Guarea gentryi Coronado
- Guarea glabra Vahl
- Guarea gomma Pulle
- Guarea gracilis T.D.Penn.
- Guarea grossa T.D.Penn.
- Guarea guentheri Harms
- Guarea guidonia (L.) Sleumer
- Guarea hoffmanniana C.DC.
- Guarea humaitensis T.D.Penn.
- Guarea inesiana Al.Rodr.
- Guarea jamaicensis Proctor
- Guarea juglandiformis T.D.Penn.
- Guarea kunthiana A.Juss.
- Guarea lozanoi Morales-P.
- Guarea luxii C.DC.
- Guarea macrocalyx Al.Rodr.
- Guarea macrophylla Vahl
- Guarea megacostata T.D.Penn.
- Guarea megantha A.Juss.
- Guarea mexicana Coronado
- Guarea michel-moddei T.D.Penn. & S.A.Mori
- Guarea pendula R.da Silva Ramalho, A.L.Pinheiro & T.D.Penn.
- Guarea persistens W.Palacios
- Guarea polymera Little
- Guarea pterorhachis Harms
- Guarea pubescens (Rich.) A.Juss.
- Guarea purusana C.DC.
- Guarea pyriformis T.D.Penn.
- Guarea reticulatovenosa T.D.Penn.
- Guarea rhopalocarpa Radlk.
- Guarea riparia W.Palacios
- Guarea scabra A.Juss.
- Guarea silvatica C.DC.
- Guarea sphenophylla Urb.
- Guarea sprucei C.DC.
- Guarea subandina W.Palacios
- Guarea subsessilifolia Al.Rodr.
- Guarea tafae-malekui Al.Rodr.
- Guarea talamancana Gómez-Laur. & Valerio
- Guarea tonduzii C.DC.
- Guarea trunciflora C.DC.
- Guarea velutina A.Juss.
- Guarea venenata T.D.Penn.
- Guarea zarceroensis Coronado
- Guarea zepivae T.D.Penn.

== Uses ==
The timber is important; the African species are known as bossé, guarea, or pink mahogany, and the South American species as cramantee or American muskwood. It is said to possibly cause hallucinations if ingested.

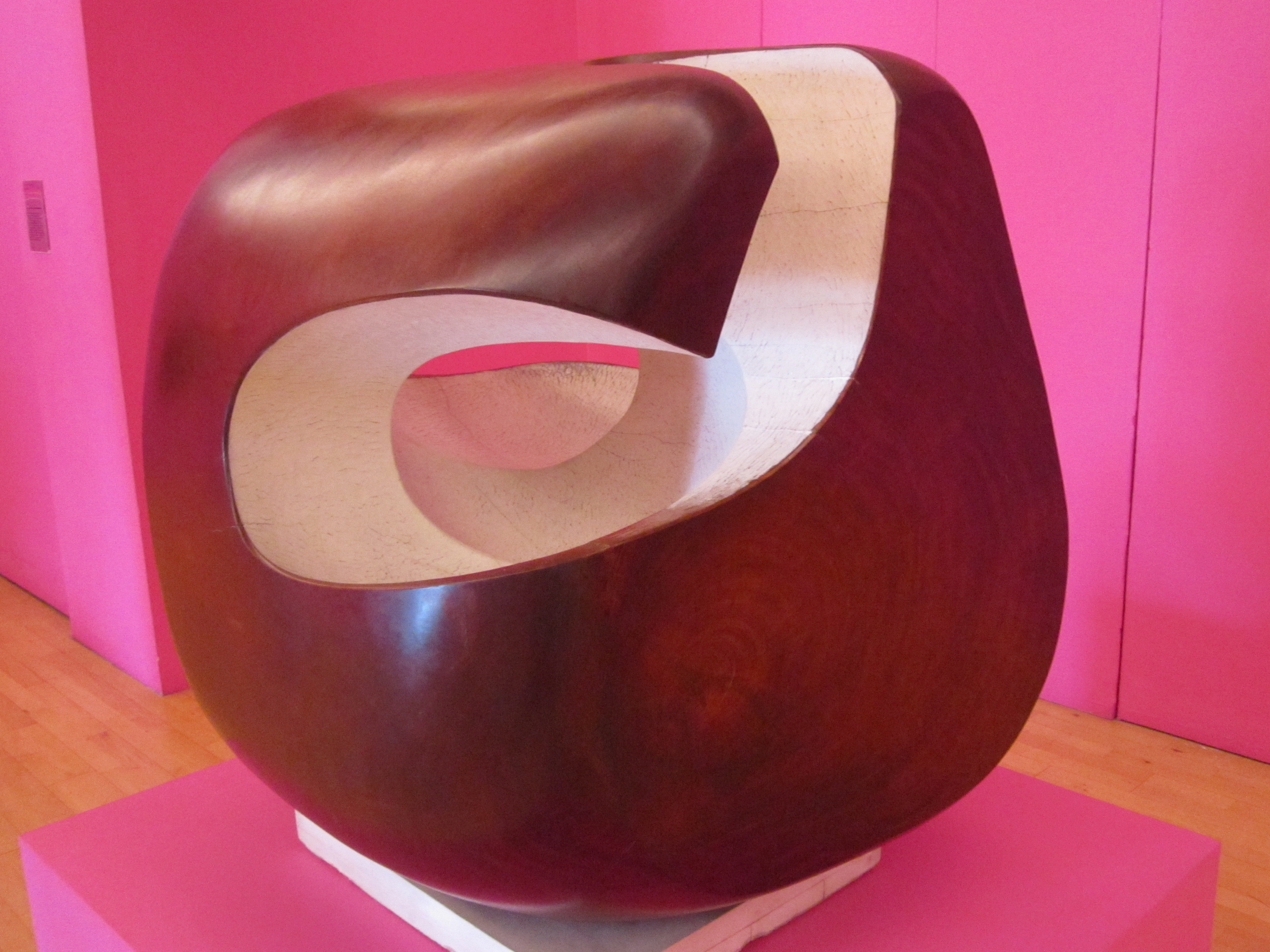
Corinthos sculpture in guarea wood by Barbara Hepworth at Tate Liverpool

The wood can be used for sculpture and was favoured by the British 20th century sculptor Barbara Hepworth.
