= Guarea sphenophylla =

Conservation status
- Vulnerable (IUCN 3.1)

Scientific classification
- Kingdom: Plantae
- Clade: Tracheophytes
- Clade: Angiosperms
- Clade: Eudicots
- Clade: Rosids
- Order: Sapindales
- Family: Meliaceae
- Genus: Guarea
- Species: G. sphenophylla

Binomial name
- Guarea sphenophylla Urban

Species of flowering plant

Guarea sphenophylla is a species of plant in the family Meliaceae. It is found in the Dominican Republic and Haiti.
