= Guarea corrugata =

Conservation status
- Least Concern (IUCN 3.1)

Scientific classification
- Kingdom: Plantae
- Clade: Tracheophytes
- Clade: Angiosperms
- Clade: Eudicots
- Clade: Rosids
- Order: Sapindales
- Family: Meliaceae
- Genus: Guarea
- Species: G. corrugata

Binomial name
- Guarea corrugata Cuatrec.

Species of flowering plant

Guarea corrugata is a species of flowering plant in the family Meliaceae. It is a tree endemic to western Colombia.
