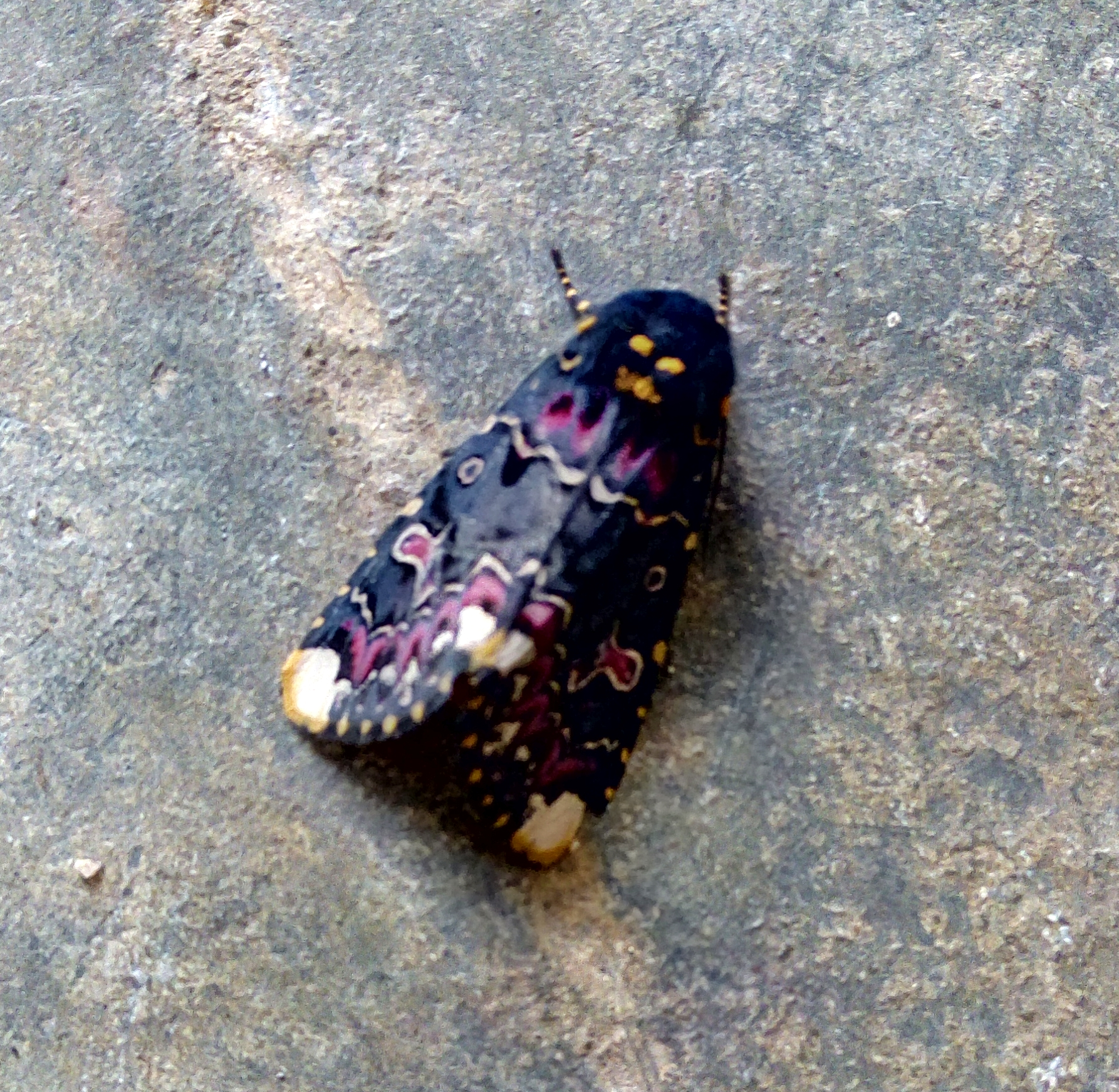
- Polytela gloriosae

Scientific classification
- Kingdom: Animalia
- Phylum: Arthropoda
- Class: Insecta
- Order: Lepidoptera
- Superfamily: Noctuoidea
- Family: Noctuidae
- Subfamily: Noctuinae
- Genus: Polytela; Guenée, 1852

= Polytela =

Genus of moths

Polytela is a genus of moths of the family Noctuidae erected by Achille Guenée in 1852. Species are distributed across the Old World.

== Description ==
Its eyes are hairy. The proboscis is well developed. Palpi porrect (extending forward) and roughly scaled, where the third joint is short. Antennae very simple. Thorax and abdomen without tufts and tibia without spines.

== Species ==
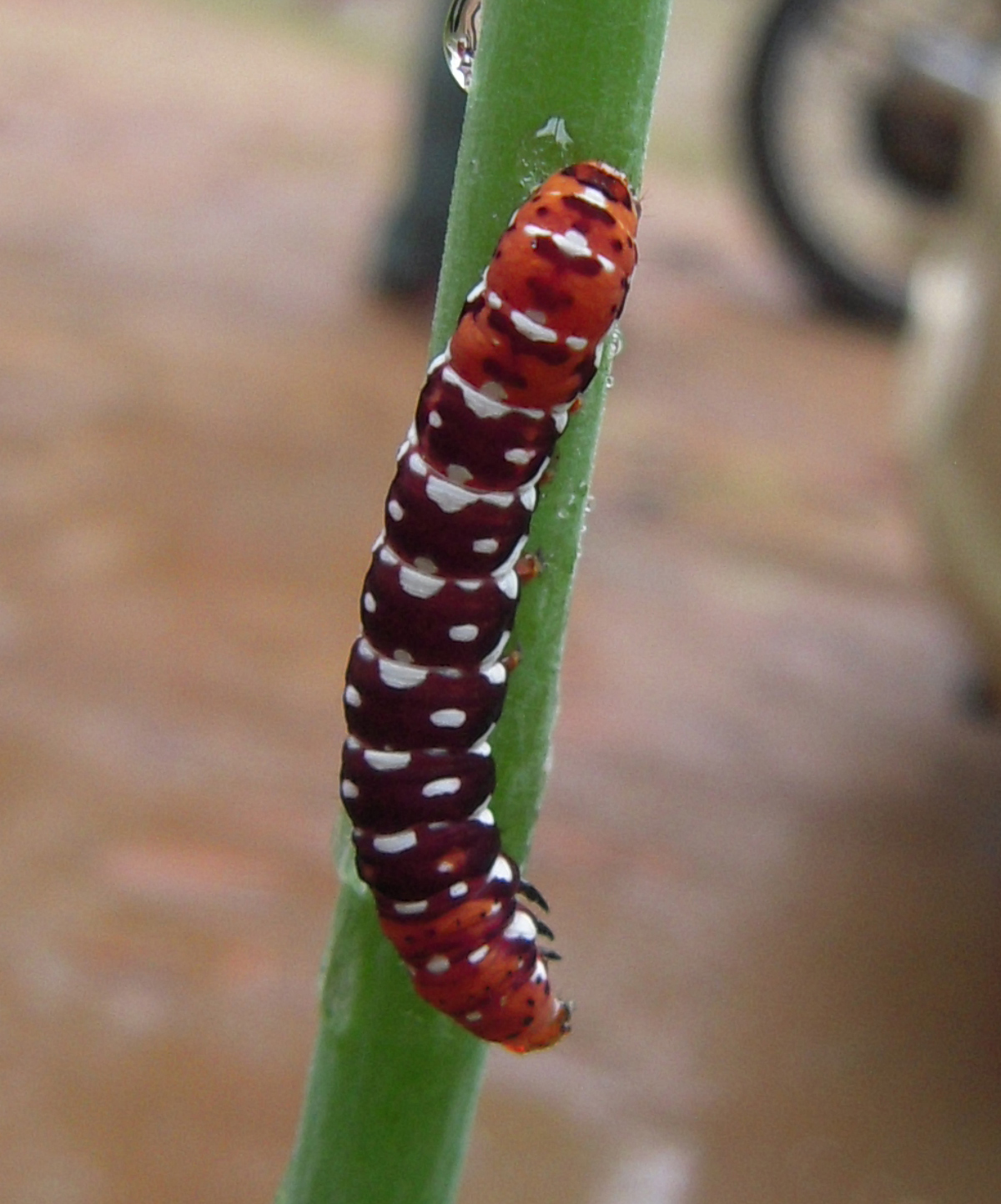
Polytela gloriosae caterpillar in India

- Polytela chrysospila Walker, 1865
- Polytela cliens (Felder & Rogenhofer, 1874)
- Polytela florigera Guenée, 1852
- Polytela gloriosae (Fabricius, 1775)
