= Guarea hoffmanniana =

Conservation status
- Least Concern (IUCN 3.1)

Scientific classification
- Kingdom: Plantae
- Clade: Tracheophytes
- Clade: Angiosperms
- Clade: Eudicots
- Clade: Rosids
- Order: Sapindales
- Family: Meliaceae
- Genus: Guarea
- Species: G. hoffmanniana

Binomial name
- Guarea hoffmanniana C.DC.

Synonyms
- Guarea macropetala T.D.Penn.

Species of plant

Guarea hoffmanniana is a species of flowering plant in the family Meliaceae. It occurs in Costa Rica and Panama.
