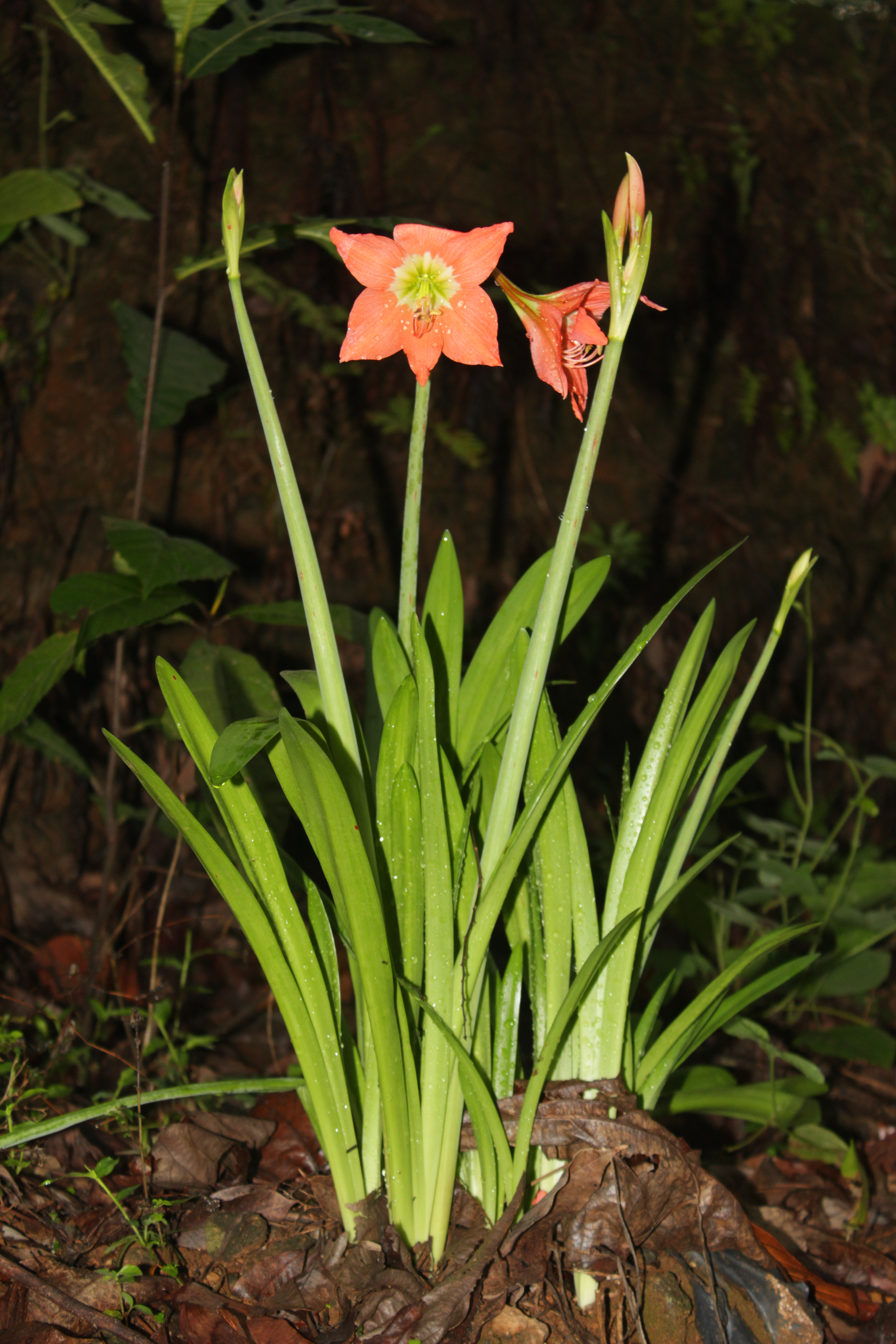

Scientific classification
- Kingdom: Plantae
- Clade: Tracheophytes
- Clade: Angiosperms
- Clade: Monocots
- Order: Asparagales
- Family: Amaryllidaceae
- Subfamily: Amaryllidoideae
- Genus: Hippeastrum
- Species: H. puniceum

Binomial name
- Hippeastrum puniceum (Lam.) Voss

Synonyms
- Amaryllis punucea Lam.

= Hippeastrum puniceum =

Species of flowering plant

Hippeastrum puniceum is a bulbous perennial native to tropical regions of South America, although it has become naturalized elsewhere. Common names include Barbados lily, Easter lily, cacao lily, cocoa lily and amaryllis lily, although it is neither a lily nor a species of Amaryllis.

== Description ==
Plants have 4–6 leaves, each of which is bright green, 30–60 cm long by 2.5–3 cm wide, strap-shaped (lorate) and tapers at the end to an acute apex. The leaves are not fully developed when the flowers appear (i.e. they are more or less hysteranthous). The flowers are borne in an umbel on a stem (scape) which is 40–60 cm tall. The umbel has lanceolate green bracts at its base. The petals, or more accurately tepals, are orange-red with paler bases. The lower two tepals are much narrower than the lateral ones.

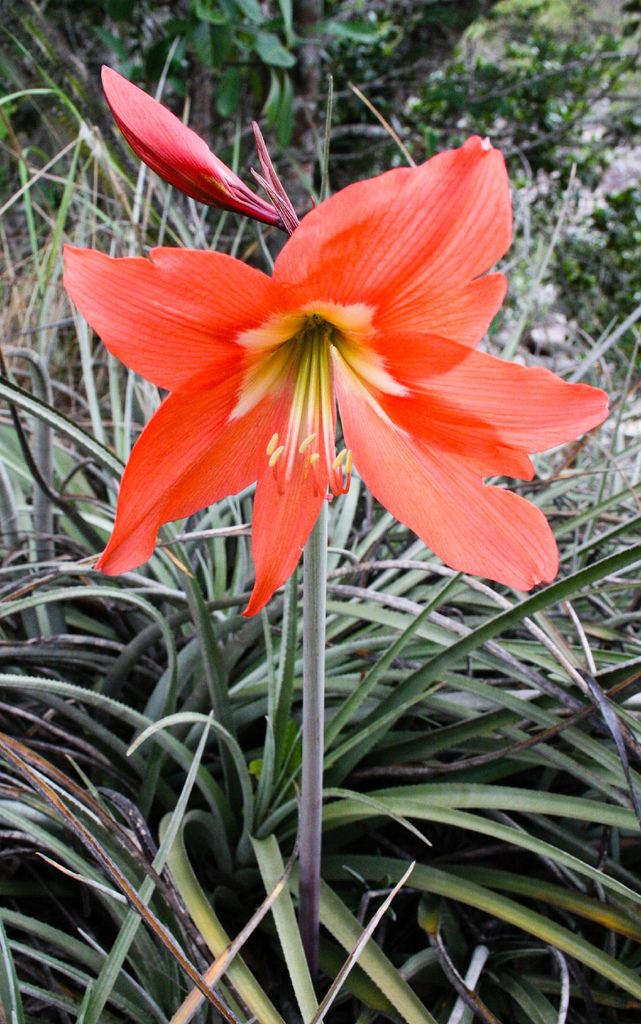
Inflorescence

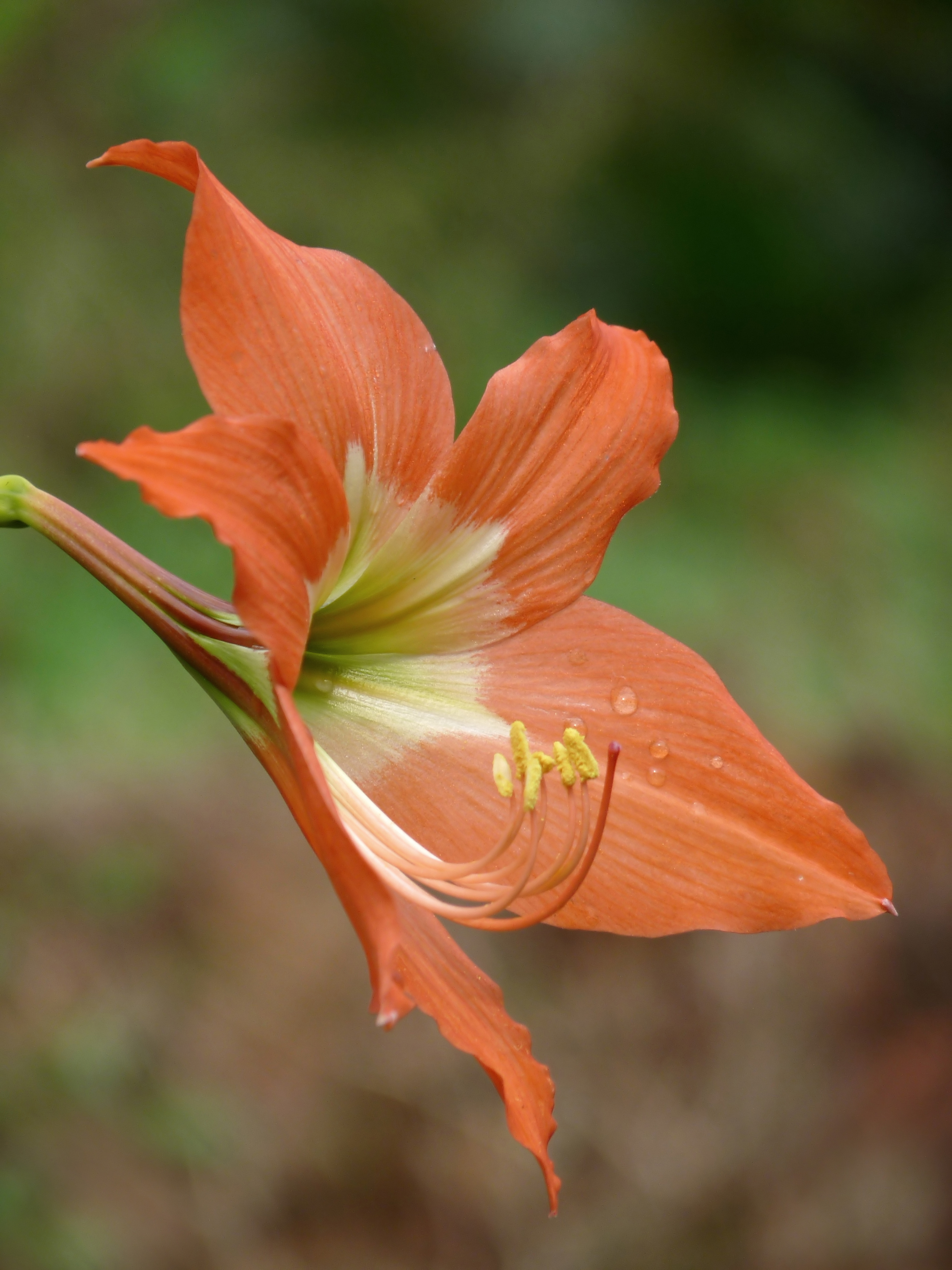
Inflorescence

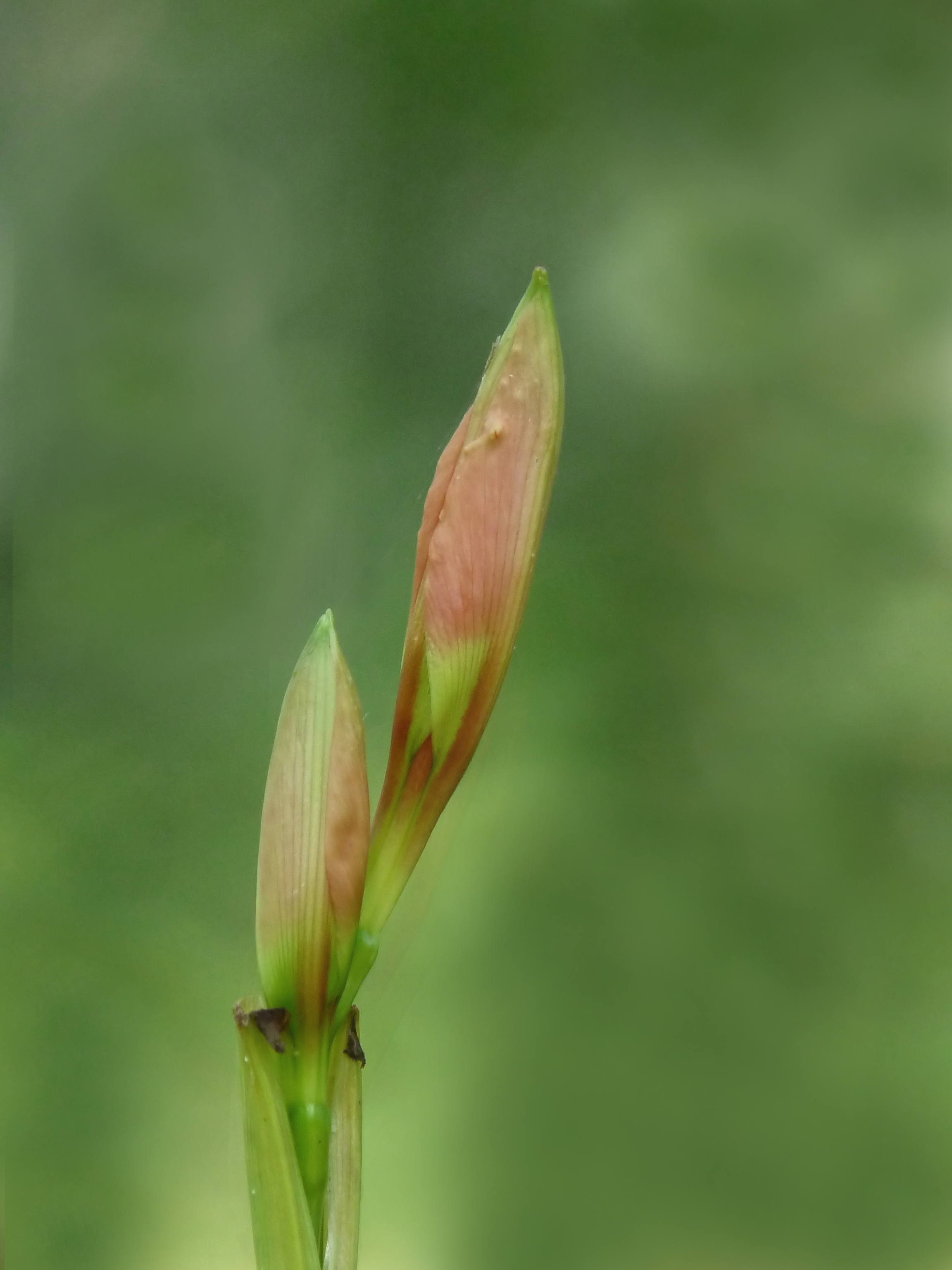
Buds

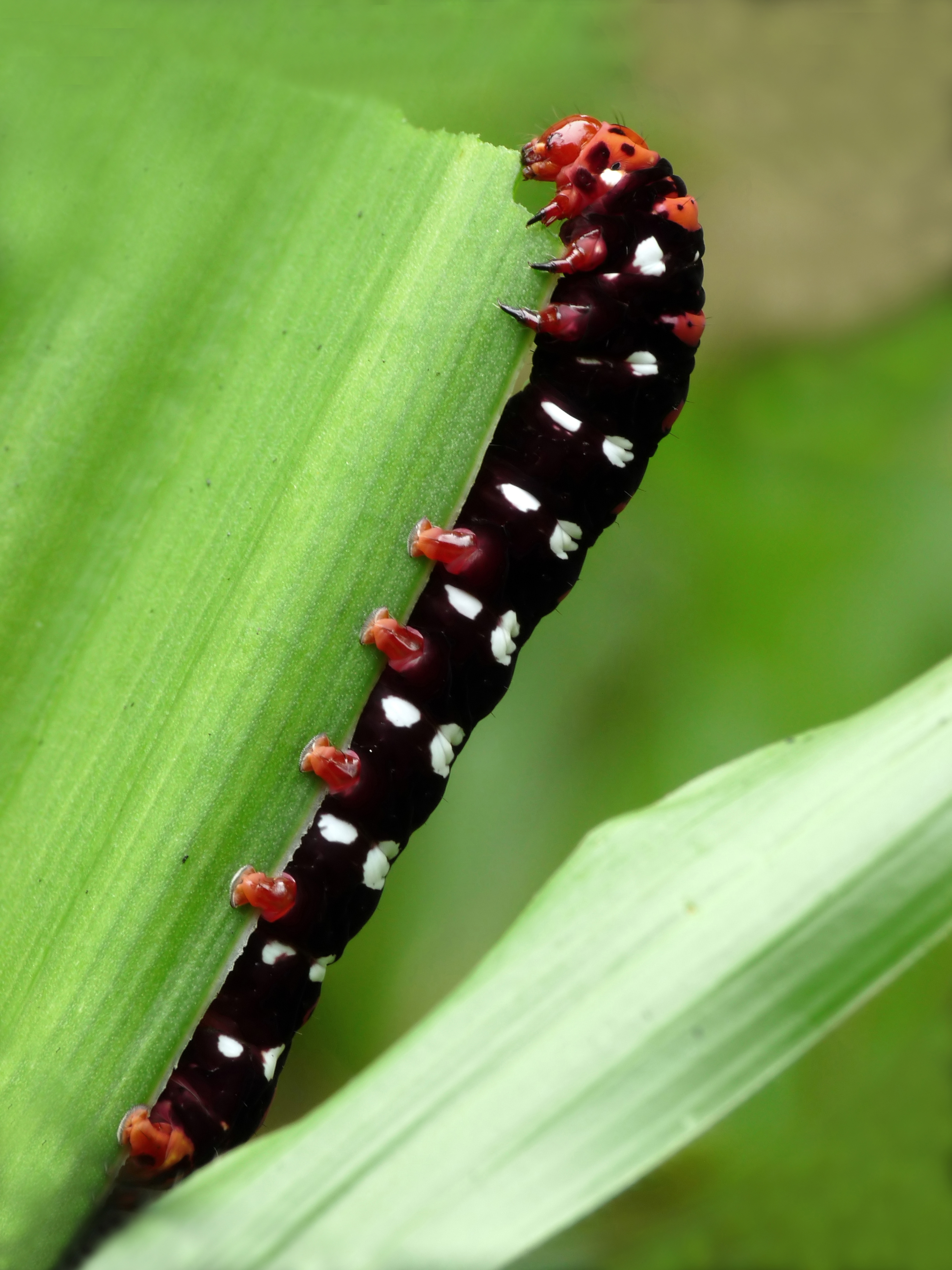
Polytela gloriosae (lily moth) larva feeding the leaf

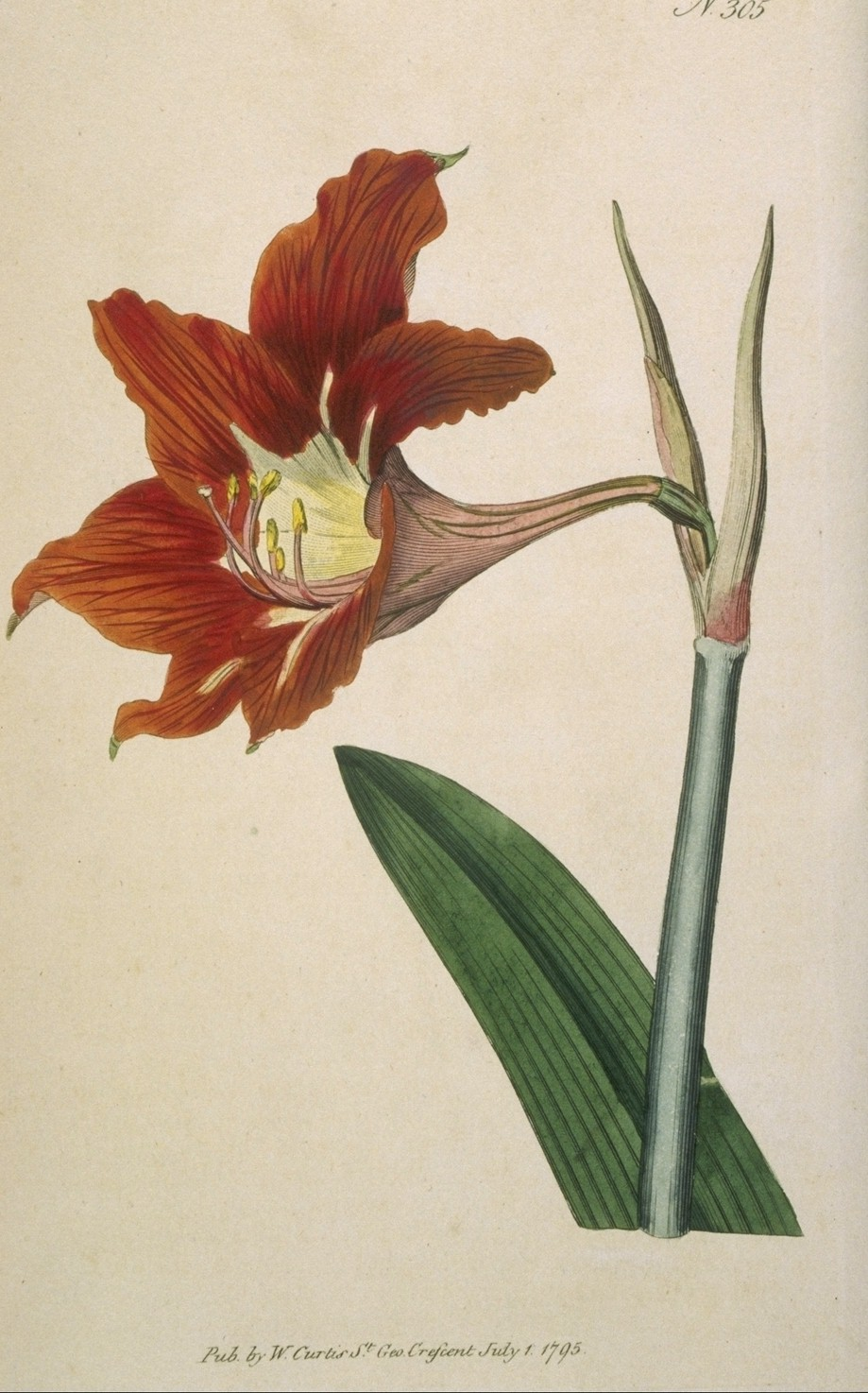
Illustration by William Curtis, S. 1795. Curtis's Botanical Magazine
