= Guarea sprucei =

Conservation status
- Endangered (IUCN 3.1)

Scientific classification
- Kingdom: Plantae
- Clade: Tracheophytes
- Clade: Angiosperms
- Clade: Eudicots
- Clade: Rosids
- Order: Sapindales
- Family: Meliaceae
- Genus: Guarea
- Species: G. sprucei

Binomial name
- Guarea sprucei C.DC.

Species of flowering plant

Guarea sprucei is a species of flowering plant in the family Meliaceae. It is a tree endemic to northern Brazil. It is threatened by habitat loss.
