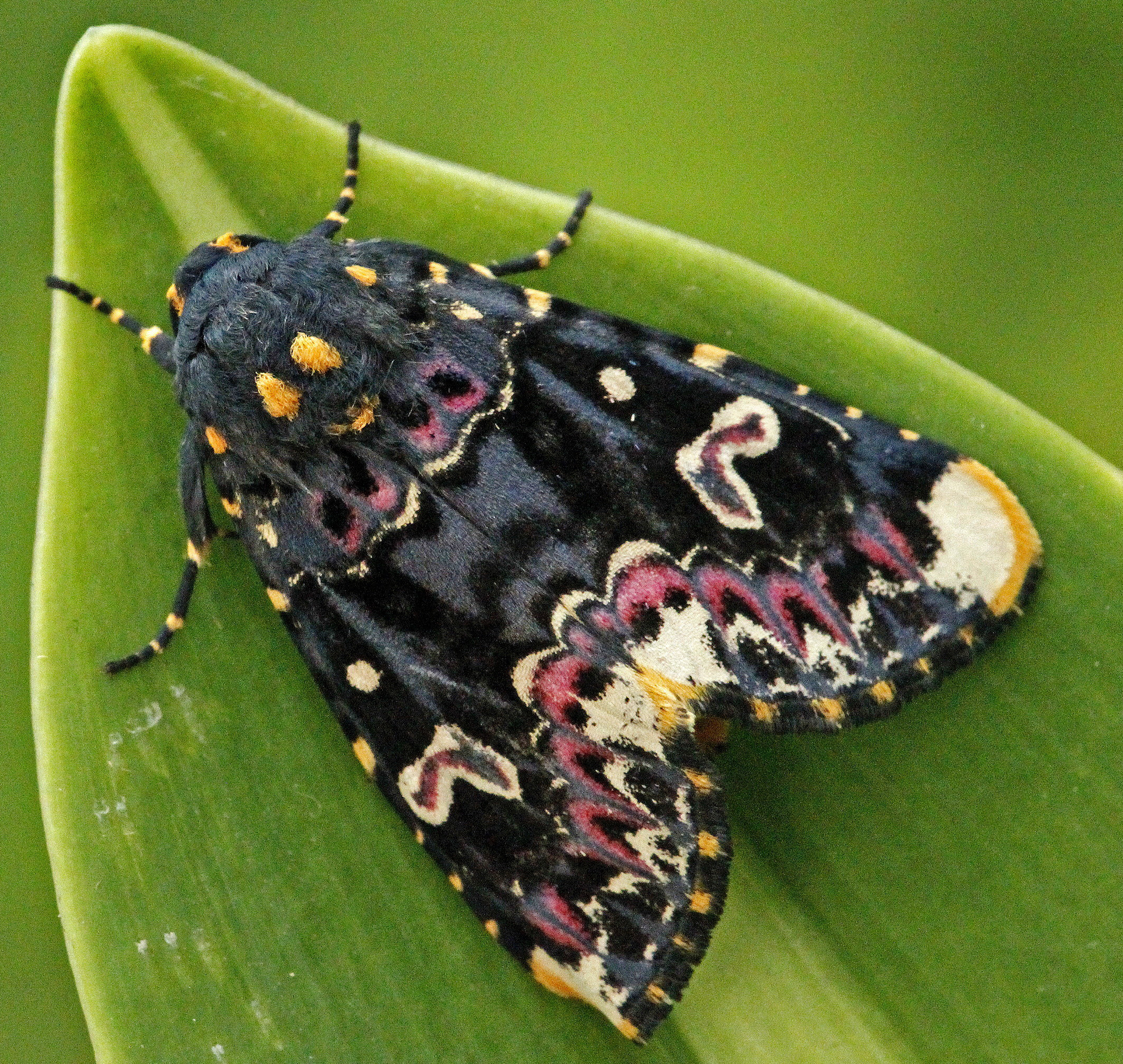

Scientific classification
- Kingdom: Animalia
- Phylum: Arthropoda
- Clade: Pancrustacea
- Class: Insecta
- Order: Lepidoptera
- Superfamily: Noctuoidea
- Family: Noctuidae
- Genus: Polytela
- Species: P. gloriosae

Binomial name
- Polytela gloriosae (Fabricius, 1781)

Synonyms
- Bombyx gloriosae Fabricius, 1775

= Polytela gloriosae =

Species of moth

Polytela gloriosae, the Indian lily moth or lily caterpillar, is a moth of the family Noctuidae. The species was first described by Johan Christian Fabricius in 1781. It is found in Sri Lanka, India and probably in Indonesia.

== Description ==
The wingspan of the male is 29 mm. Its eyes are hairy and its proboscis is fully developed. Palpi porrect (extending forward) and roughly scaled. Head and thorax are blue black. Antennae orange. Three orange specks are found on the metathorax. Abdomen blackish with orange terminal segments. Forewings blue black. There is an orange speck at the base. Two pink and black lunules run towards the inner margin. Orbicular is yellow with a ring mark. Reniform yellowish. Large orange blotches are found at the apex and outer angle. Hindwings fuscous.

The caterpillar is smooth and purple black. Series of white spots on dorsal, lateral, and sublateral areas. Purplish lateral blotches on thoracic somites. Head and legs are reddish. Early instars are more reddish brown. Body colour turns darker as the caterpillar reaches later instars. Eggs are small spherical and yellow.

== Life cycle ==
The female lays 80 to 90 eggs in 2 to 4 clusters. Eggs are hatched within 4 days. Eggs turn black after 3 days. Larval stage comprises five instars. It takes about 8 to 10 days to complete the larval stage.

- First instar - 3–10 mm long. Head black, body light brown. Gregarious and feeding starts six hours after hatching. Stage lasts for 1-1.5 days.
- Second instar - 1–2 cm long. Head black. Body light brown with white spots. Stage lasts for 1.5 days.
- Third instar - 2–3 cm long. Head black. Body with 5 black spot rows and 6 orange spots. Feed voraciously on leaves. Stage lasts for 2 days.
- Fourth instar - 3-3.8 cm long. Head black. Body with 5 white spot rows on back and 6 orange spots anteriorly and posteriorly. Feeds on tissues. Stage lasts for 2 days.
- Fifth instar - 3.5–4 cm long. Head black. Body with 5 white spot rows and 6 orange spots anteriorly and posteriorly. Feeds on tissues and plant destroyed completely. Stage lasts for 2.5 days.

Pupa obtect. Anterior side broader. Early stages light coloured. It turns dark brownish to blackish in emergence time. Pupation occurs within soil in earthen cell. Stage lasts for 7.5 days.

== Biology ==
The caterpillar is a minor pest on several plants of the families Liliaceae and Amaryllidaceae. Larval food plants include Gloriosa superba, Crinum asiaticum, Zephyranthes carinata, Zephyranthes citrina, Scadoxus multiflorus, Amaryllis and Lilium species. They can be controlled using pesticides such as malathion and azadirachtin. Biological control can be used through the fungus Metarhizium and a tachinid fly.

== Gallery ==
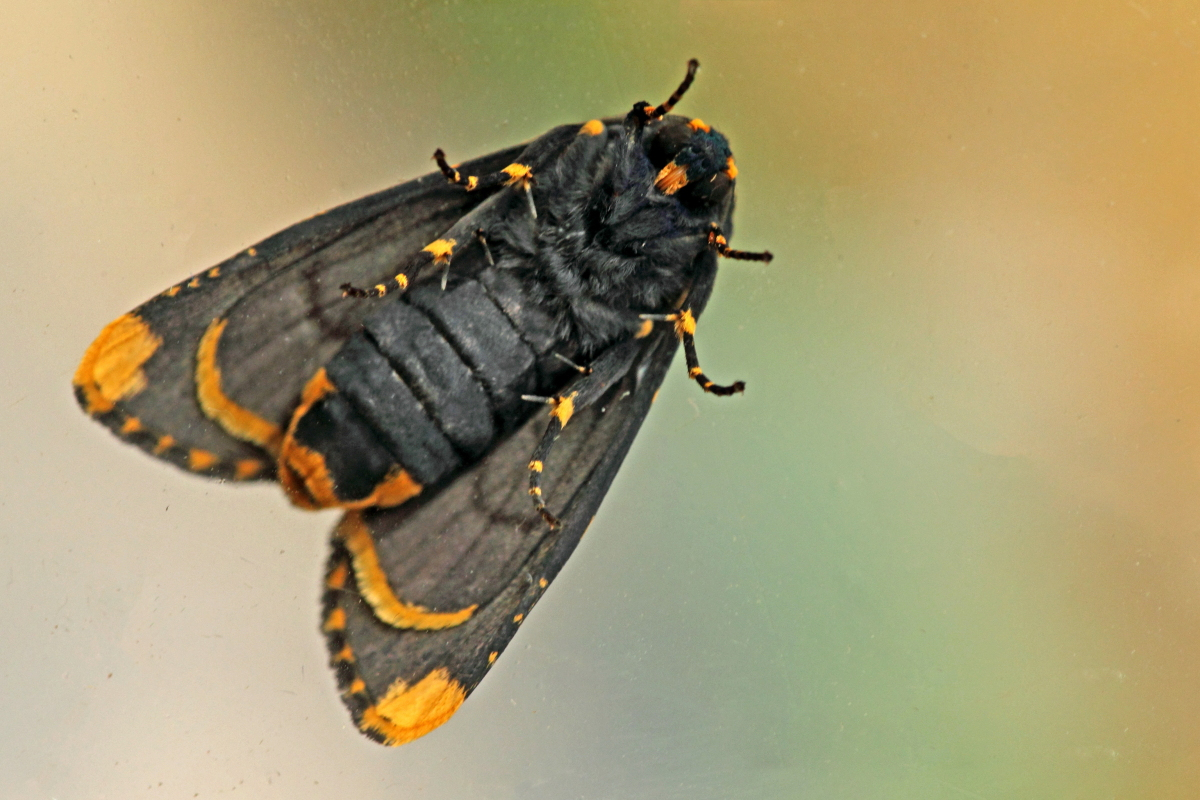
Underside of adult

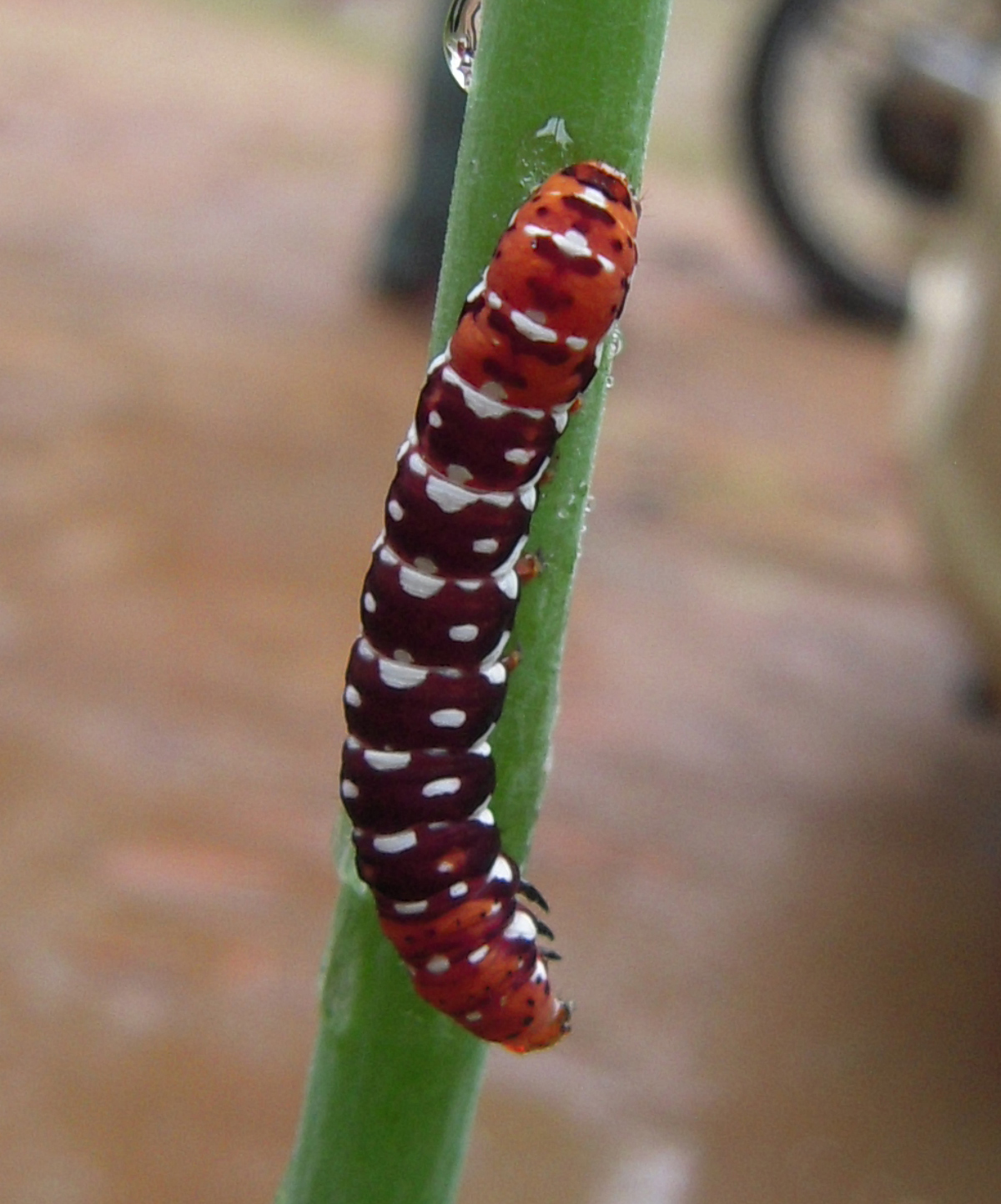
Caterpillar

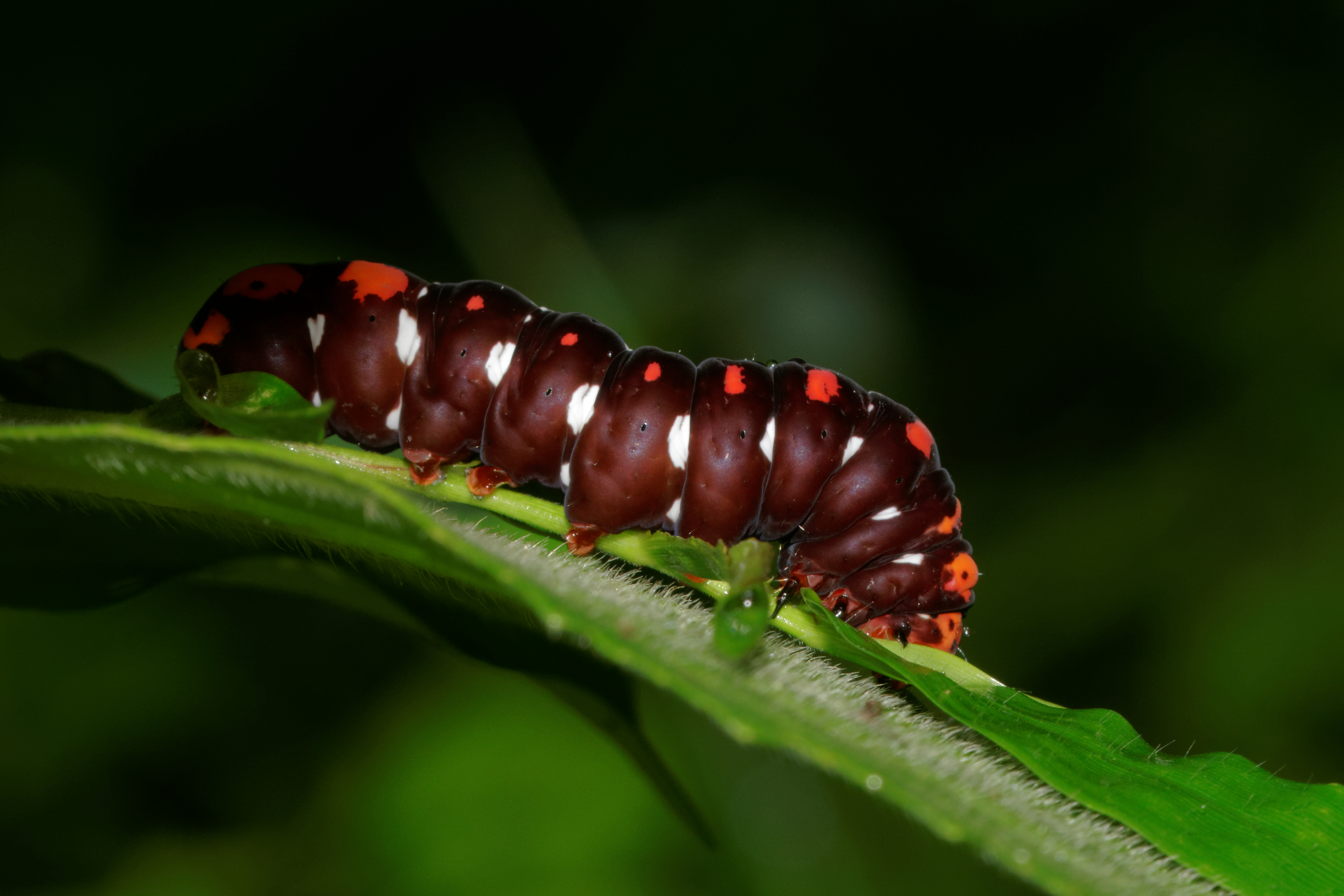
Late instar

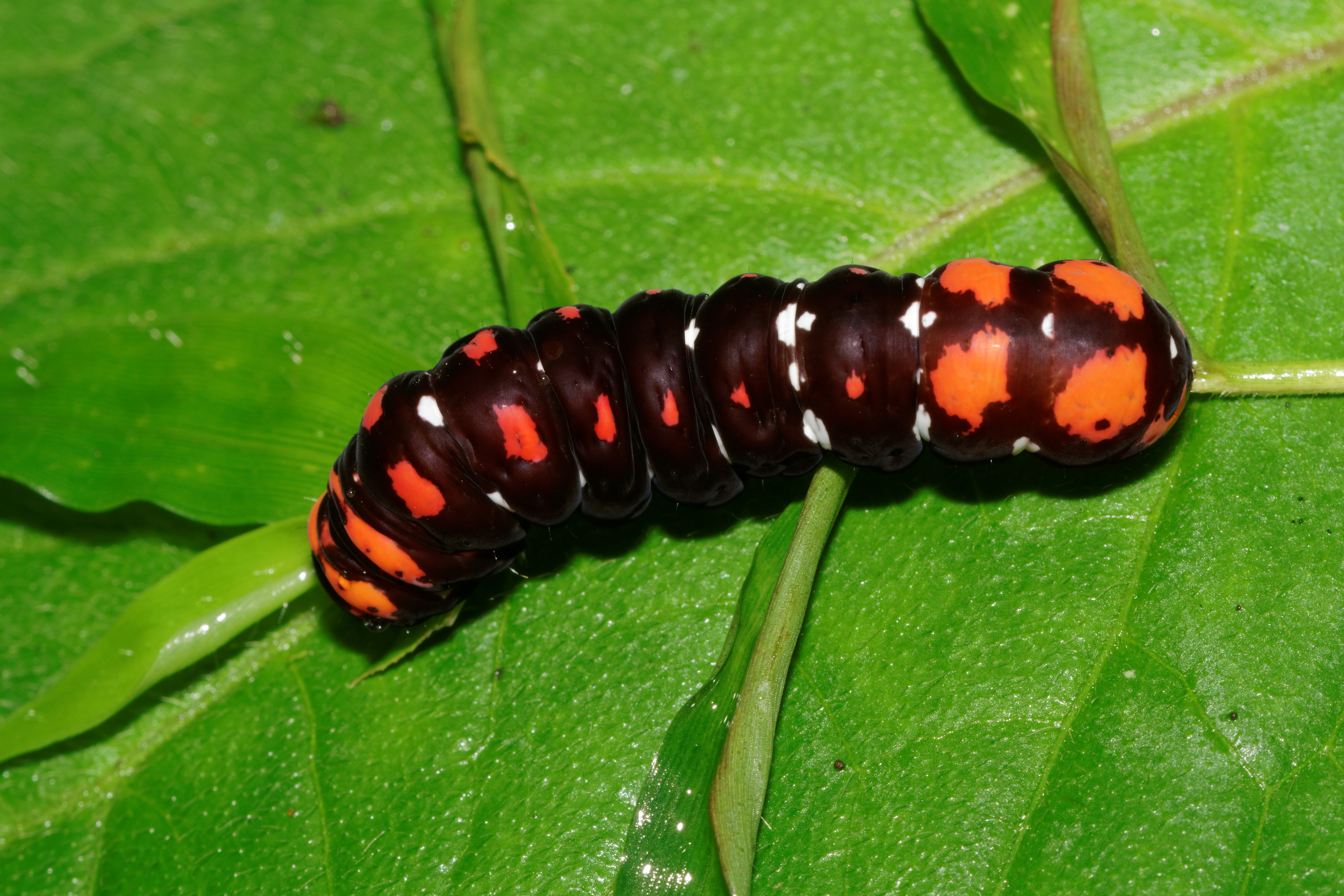
Caterpillar

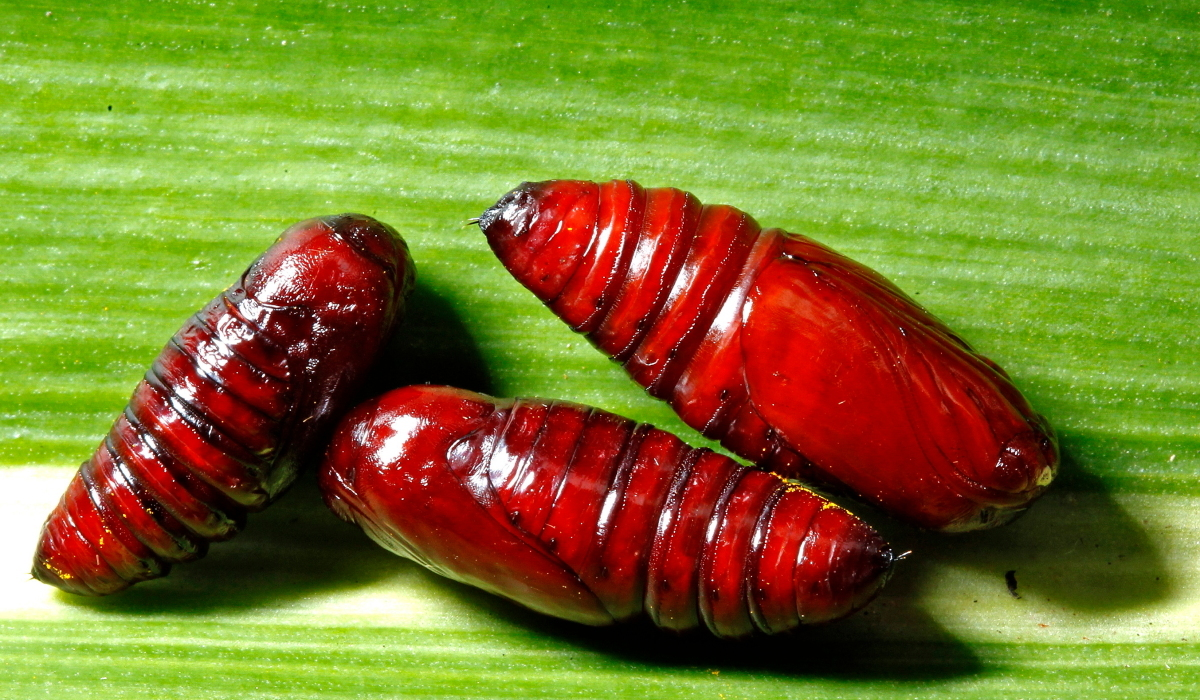
Pupa
