= Diospyros revoluta =

Scientific classification
- Kingdom: Plantae
- Clade: Tracheophytes
- Clade: Angiosperms
- Clade: Eudicots
- Clade: Asterids
- Order: Ericales
- Family: Ebenaceae
- Genus: Diospyros
- Species: D. revoluta

Binomial name
- Diospyros revoluta Poir. (1825)

Species of tree

Diospyros revoluta is a species of plant in the family Ebenaceae. It is a tree native to Hispaniola, Puerto Rico, the Leeward Islands, and Windward Islands.
