= Crataegus pubescens =

Crataegus pubescens may refer to:

- Crataegus pubescens C.Presl. a Sicilian hawthorn, sometimes considered to be a synonym of Crataegus orientalis
- Crataegus pubescens Steud. an illegitimate name for Crataegus mexicana
