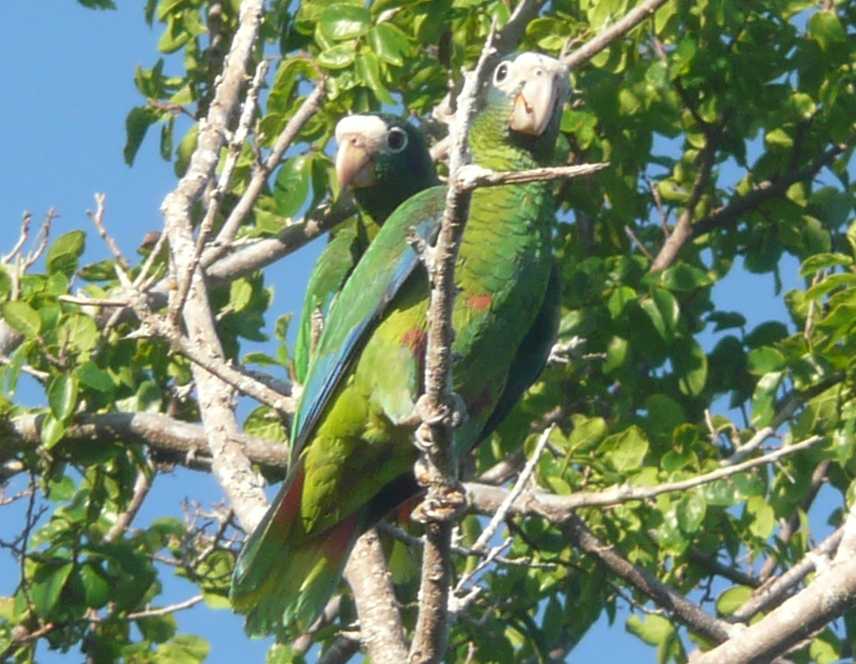

Conservation status
- Vulnerable (IUCN 3.1)

Scientific classification
- Kingdom: Animalia
- Phylum: Chordata
- Class: Aves
- Order: Psittaciformes
- Family: Psittacidae
- Genus: Amazona
- Species: A. ventralis

Binomial name
- Amazona ventralis (Müller, 1776)

= Hispaniolan amazon =

Hispaniolan parrot

Species of parrot endemic to Hispaniola

The Hispaniolan parrot (Amazona ventralis), also known as Hispaniolan amazon, is a species of psittaciform bird of the family Psittacidae endemic to Hispaniola, which includes the Dominican Republic and Haiti. Its white forehead, light beak, white eye-ring, blue ear patch, and maroon belly patch are the main features that differentiate it from other amazons. Its body measures about 28 centimeters in length. A typical adult weighs 250g (8.75 oz).

This species was widespread in Hispaniola, but it suffered a significant decline during the twentieth century. Its range was mainly limited to inland mountains in the 1930s and is becoming more typical in metropolitan cities such as Santo Domingo.

== Taxonomy ==
German biologist Philipp Ludwig Statius Müller published the first scientific description in 1776. In 1535, Spanish historian Gonzalo Fernández de Oviedo published written descriptions of the Hispaniolan parrot. Oviedo describes them as Higuacas name derived from the Taíno word for these birds. Oviedo describes them:

In this island are three species of them large some, others minor and very small. The great ones are called by the Indians Higuacas, the middle long syllable [stressed], and these differ from those of the other islands in that they have a white forehead, not green or red. Those of this type in Cuba have a red forehead-heads. These are very talkative when taught to speak human words. The other the type, medium-sized, is called xaxabis. They are much greener and some have red featherers. They are very noisy, nervous and restless. They bite and are more irritable than the others. They never learn anything about the human speak no matter how much they are taught, but they are very talkative in his own language. Ten of these xaxabis attack a hundred higuacas and take them down and they never meet together in peace with each other. Each species comes in a flock to get together a lot and where one goes everyone goes, each species calls in its own way. The figs have a louder sound and deeper, the xaxabis sharper and higher launched. Although the Xaxabis do not speak human's words, still, placed in a cage is a pleasure to see them.

— Gonzalo Fernández de Oviedo, De la natural hystoria de las Indias

Amazona ventralis, Amazona leucocephala, and Amazona vittata are all believed to be descendants of Amazona albifrons a Central American parrot. Based on mitochondrial DNA, the colonization of Hispaniola by the Amazon parrots occurred circa 760,000 years ago.

== Description ==
They have bright green feathers with blue edges on most of them. They feature black ear coverts, some blue patches on the cheeks and crown, some red patches under the chin, and a noticeable white forehead and area surrounding the eyes. Additionally, they have red feathers on their abdomens, blue wind coverts, green outer web edges, yellowish green underfur, a green tail with yellow tips on the upper side, red outer tail feathers at the base, a horn-colored bill, and brown eyes with pale feet. Their bodies measure approximately 28 centimeters long. A typical adult weights 250g (8.75 oz), and they have a large, robust beak.

=== Ecology ===
They inhabit a variety of wooded environments around 1,500 meters above sea level, from arid savanna palm groves, pine forests, and humid mountain forests. They frequently forage on cultivated lands, such as banana plantations and cornfields. They are found at all elevations in forests, groves, and thickets, wherever there are suitable fruits and seeds. Populations have been limited to forest reserves and national parks such as Jaragua, Cotubanamá, and Los Haitises. They consume seeds or fruits of Caesalpinia, Psidium and Ficus.

=== Population ===
The population is estimated to be around 10,000-19,999 individuals. This equates to 6,667-13,333 mature individuals, rounded here to 6,000-15,000 mature individuals.

=== Breeding ===
Parrots form a couple for life, and lay 2–4 eggs per clutch. They typically nest in cavities in trees up to 20 meters above the ground, but nests have been found as low as 1.5 meters. It has also been reported nesting on rocky ledges. Breeding between the months of February and June. Prospecting pairs have been observed in mid-April, suggesting that the season may extend further in the year.

== Threats ==
Traffickers removing chicks from their nests can destroy the cavities in the trees that the parrots reuse each season, reducing the likelihood of parrots being able to successfully nest. Additionally, they are hunted for food, trapped for local trade, and are trapped for international trade as cage birds. It is also treated as a crop pest.

The trade or possession of parrots is banned under Dominican Republic law.
