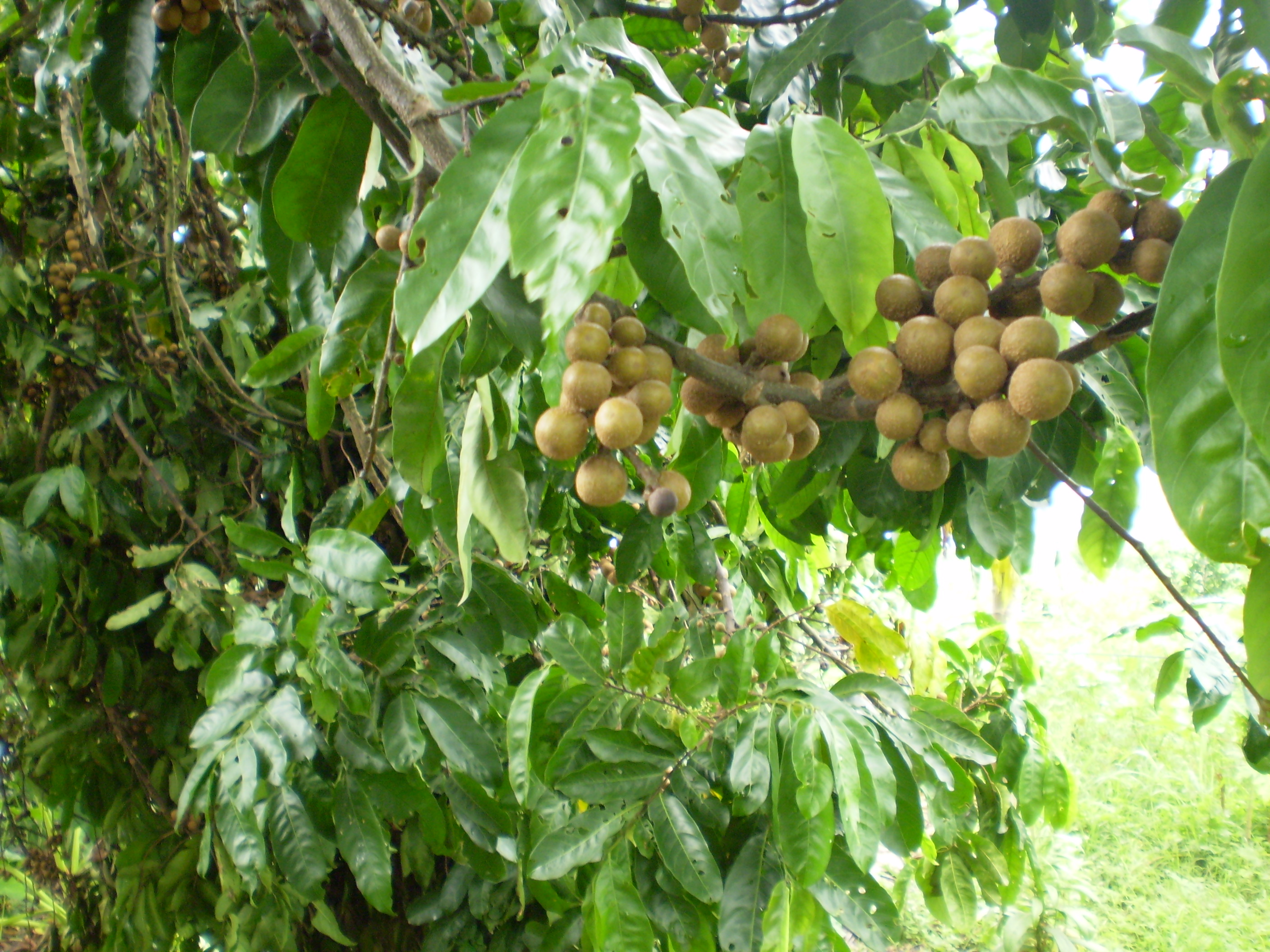

Conservation status
- Least Concern (IUCN 3.1)

Scientific classification
- Kingdom: Plantae
- Clade: Tracheophytes
- Clade: Angiosperms
- Clade: Eudicots
- Clade: Rosids
- Order: Sapindales
- Family: Meliaceae
- Genus: Guarea
- Species: G. guidonia

Binomial name
- Guarea guidonia (L.) Sleumer

Synonyms
- Guarea rusbyi (Britton) Rusby

= Guarea guidonia =

Species of plant

Guarea guidonia is a species of flowering plant in the family Meliaceae. It ranges from Cuba and Honduras south to Argentina.

The bark of Guarea rusbyi (Britton) Rusby, a synonym of Guarea guidonia (L.) Sleumer, is used as an expectorant named cocillana.
