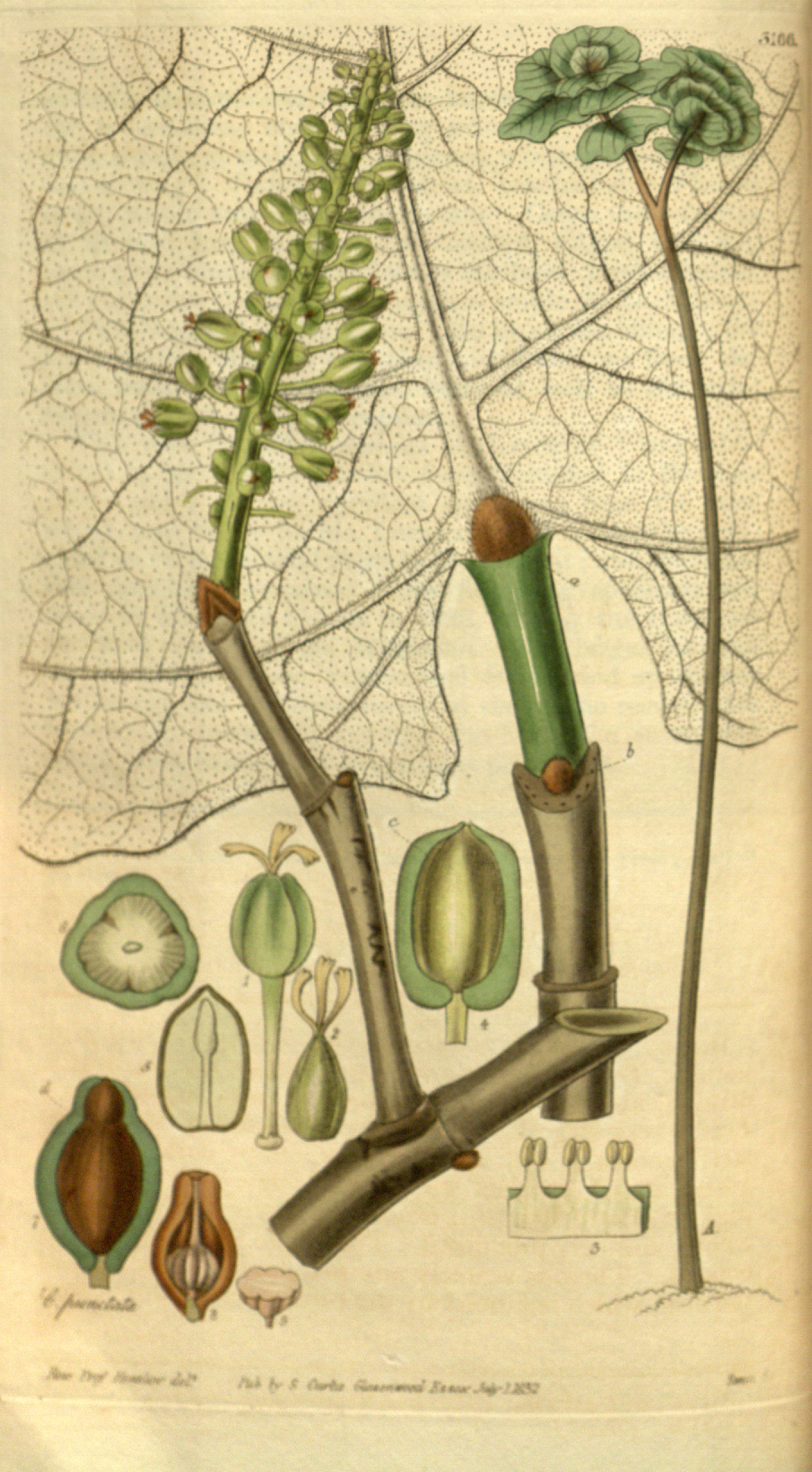
- Illustration from 1832

Scientific classification
- Kingdom: Plantae
- Clade: Tracheophytes
- Clade: Angiosperms
- Clade: Eudicots
- Order: Caryophyllales
- Family: Polygonaceae
- Genus: Coccoloba
- Species: C. pubescens

Binomial name
- Coccoloba pubescens L.

= Coccoloba pubescens =

Species of flowering plant

Coccoloba pubescens, known as grandleaf seagrape, largeleaf, mountain-grape, and Eve's umbrella, is a species of Coccoloba native to coastal regions of the Caribbean: on Antigua, Barbados, Barbuda, Dominica, Hispaniola, Martinique, Montserrat, and Puerto Rico.

== Description ==
Grandleaf seagrape is a medium-sized tree growing to 24 m tall, with an open, sparsely branched crown. The leaves are orbicular, very variable in size, from 2.5–45 cm diameter, rarely up to 90 cm diameter, bright green above, paler below with yellow to reddish veins, and a smooth, wavy margin.

The flowers are greenish-white, produced on erect spikes up to 60 cm long. The fruit is 2 cm in diameter.
