= Nine-primaried oscine =

Group of birds

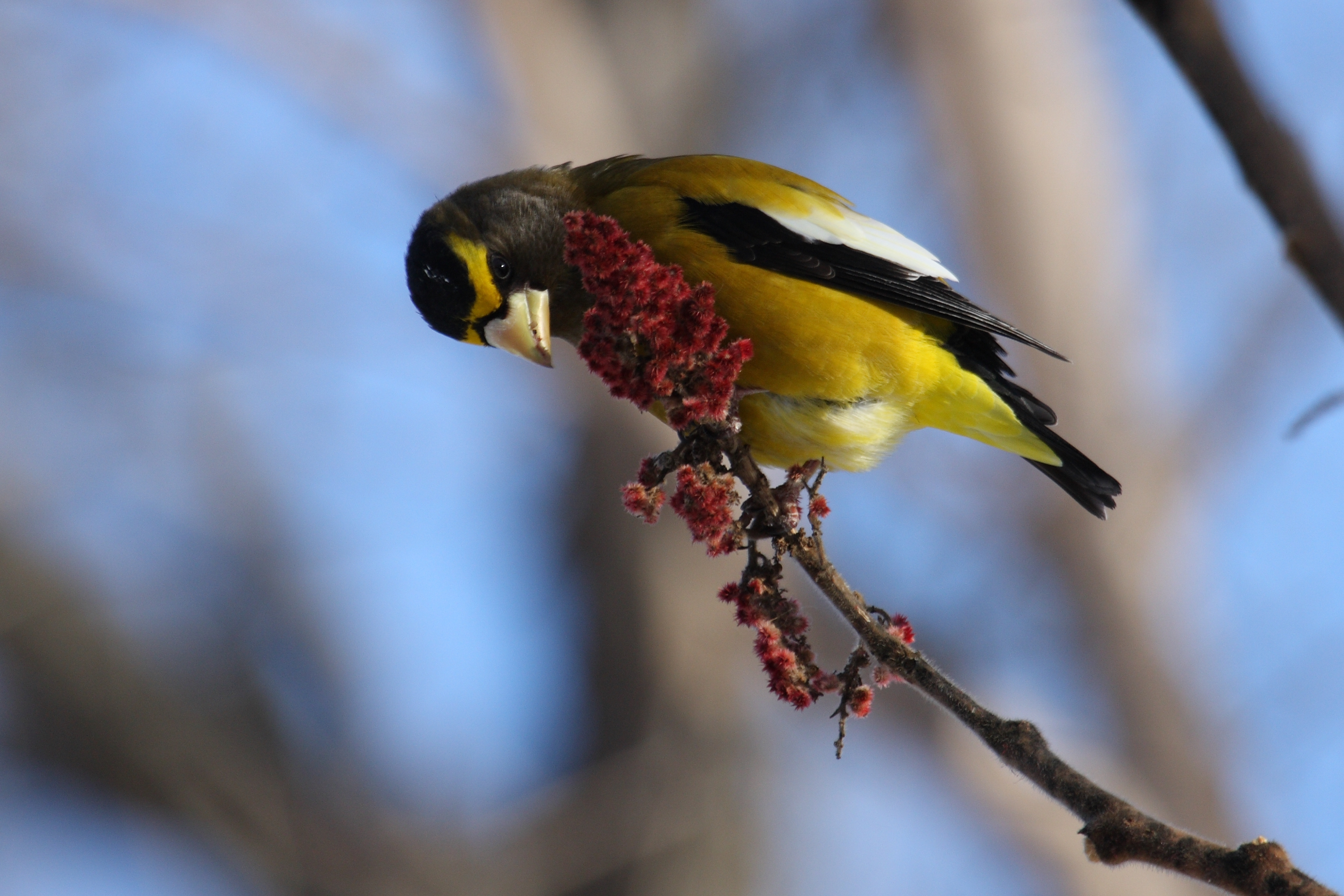
Male Evening grosbeak

The nine-primaried oscines is a group of bird families in the suborder Passeri (oscines) of the Passeriformes. The composition of the group has changed since the term was introduced but is now considered to consist of seven major families—Fringillidae, Emberizidae, Cardinalidae, Thraupidae, Passerellidae, Parulidae and Icteridae—plus some small families. When Fringillidae is omitted the remaining six families are referred to as the "New World" nine-primaried oscines.

The name of this group arises from the fact that all species within it have only nine easily visible primary feathers on each wing (in reality most, if not all, also have a tenth primary, but it is greatly reduced and largely concealed).

== Wallace's classification ==
In 1874 the British naturalist Alfred Russel Wallace classified the passerines by the number of primary feathers and placed ten families in his nine-primaried group, the Tanagroid Passeres:

- Motacillidae – wagtails and pipits
- Mniotiltidae – New World warblers, now in Parulidae
- Coerebidae – honeycreepers, now in Thraupidae
- Drepanidae – Hawaiian honeycreepers, later Drepanididae, now in Fringillidae
- Dicaeidae – flowerpeckers
- Ampelidae – waxwings, now in Bombycillidae
- Hirundinidae – swallows and martins
- Tanagridae – tanagers, now in Thraupidae, and euphonias, now in Fringillidae
- Fringillidae – finches, plus buntings, now in Emberizidae, and American sparrows, now in Passerellidae
- Icteridae – grackles, New World blackbirds and orioles

== Modern grouping ==
Six of Wallace's families are now included in the nine-primaried oscines: Mniotiltidae, Coerebidae, Drepanidae, Tanagridae, Fringillidae and Icteridae. The other four families are now known to be less closely related.

Although the New World nine-primaried oscines are most diverse in northern South America, they are widespread throughout the New World including the Greater and Lesser Antilles. They have also colonised the Galápagos (Darwin's finches) and the Tristan da Cunha group in the South Atlantic (Nesospiza and Rowettia in Thraupidae). Two families, the Emberizidae (buntings) and the Calcariidae (longspurs and snow buntings), have colonised the Old World.

The group without the Fringillidae, the New World nine-primaried oscines, is the superfamily Emberizoidea. The superfamily comprises some 870 species or 8% of all birds. It is divided into 16 families:

- - Fringillidae
  - Emberizoidea
    - - Rhodinocichlidae
      - - - Calcariidae
          - Emberizidae
        - - - Cardinalidae
            - - Mitrospingidae
              - Thraupidae
          - - Passerellidae
            - - - Icteridae
                - Parulidae
              - - Calyptophilidae
                - - Phaenicophilidae
                  - Zeledoniidae

Phylogenetic relationships between the families of the nine-primaried oscines based on the analysis of Carl Oliveros and colleagues published in 2019. (Note: A 2020 study by Heiner Kuhl and colleagues omitted Rhodinocichlidae, Calyptophilidae and Phaenicophilidae but obtained a similar phylogeny for the remaining families. Earlier studies using more limited DNA sequence data obtained different relationships between the families.)

- Fringillidae – 228 species: finches and euphonias
- Rhodinocichlidae – rosy thrush-tanager
- Calcariidae – 6 species: longspurs and snow buntings
- Emberizidae – 44 species: buntings
- Cardinalidae – 53 species: cardinals
- Mitrospingidae – 4 species: mitrospingid tanagers
- Thraupidae – 383 species: tanagers and allies
- Passerellidae – 136 species: New World sparrows, bush tanagers
- Parulidae – 119 species: New World warblers
- Icteriidae – yellow-breasted chat
- Icteridae – 109 species: grackles, New World blackbirds, and New World orioles
- Calyptophilidae – 2 species: chat-tanagers
- Zeledoniidae – wrenthrush
- Teretistridae – 2 species: Cuban warblers (Note: The family Teretistridae (Cuban warblers) is tentatively placed here. The family was not included in the analysis published by Oliveros et al (2019). Barker et al (2013) found that Teretistridae is closely related to Zeledoniidae.)
- Nesospingidae – Puerto Rican tanager
- Spindalidae – 4 species: spindalises
- Phaenicophilidae – 4 species: Hispaniolan tanagers
