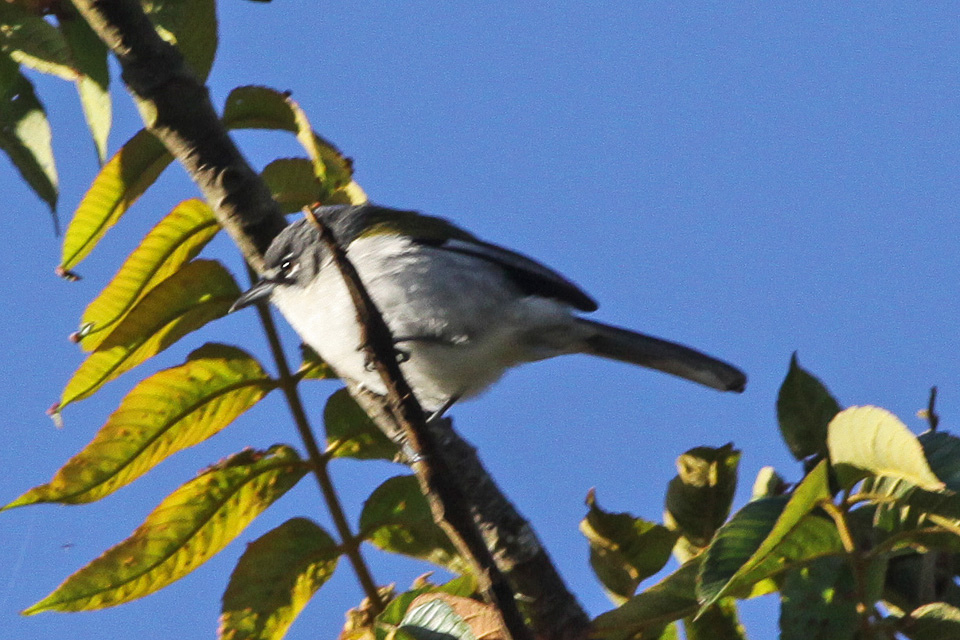

Conservation status
- Vulnerable (IUCN 3.1)

Scientific classification
- Kingdom: Animalia
- Phylum: Chordata
- Class: Aves
- Order: Passeriformes
- Family: Phaenicophilidae
- Subfamily: Phaenicophilinae
- Genus: Xenoligea; Bond, 1967
- Species: X. montana

Binomial name
- Xenoligea montana (Chapman, 1917)

= White-winged warbler =

Species of bird endemic to Hispaniola

The white-winged warbler (Xenoligea montana), also called the white-winged ground-warbler or Hispaniolan highland-tanager, is a Vulnerable species of bird of the family Phaenicophilidae, the Hispaniolan tanagers. It is endemic to the island of Hispaniola which is shared by Haiti and the Dominican Republic.

== Taxonomy and systematics ==
The white-winged warbler is the only member of genus Xenoligea. It was originally named Microligea montana, sharing that genus with the green-tailed warbler (M. palustris), but was later recognized in its own genus. Those two species were originally placed in the New World wood warbler family Parulidae, but taxonomists were unsure they belonged there. DNA evidence published in the early 2010s showed they were not related to other wood warblers and in 2017, they were moved to the newly created family Phaenicophilidae. The two species in the genus Phaenicophilus were also moved there from the "true" tanager family Thraupidae.

The white-winged warbler is monotypic, with no subspecies recognized.

== Description ==
The white-winged warbler is 13 to 14 cm (5.1 to 5.5 in) and weighs 12 to 13 g (0.42 to 0.46 oz). The sexes are alike and not particularly dimorphous. Adults have a gray head and neck, a white stripe from the beak to the eye above black lores, and white arcs above and below the eye. The back and rump is olive and the tail an almost-black dark gray with white spots on the tips of the outer feathers. The wings are also very dark gray with white on the primaries that shows as a white patch on the closed wing. The underparts are white-washed with gray on the breast and flanks. Juveniles are similar to adults, but with an overall brown cast to the adult colors.

== Distribution and habitat ==
The white-winged warbler is limited to montane regions of the Dominican Republic and Haiti. In the former it is found in the Cordillera Central, Sierra de Bahoruco, and Sierra de Neiba. In Haiti it is found in the Massif de la Hotte on the western Tiburon Peninsula and possibly other parts of the peninsula closer to the Dominican Republic. The species inhabits several forest types that have in common a dense understory; they include mature humid broadleaf, pine-broadleaf, pine, and karst limestone forests, as well as secondary forest. In elevation it ranges between 875 and 2,000 m (2,900 and 6,600 ft), but is most numerous above 1,300 m (4,300 ft).

== Lifespan ==
The white-winged warbler has a typical lifespan of three to six years. The oldest known individual was a bird that was banded in 1998 and recaptured in 2006.

== Behavior ==
=== Movement ===
The white-winged warbler is a year-round resident throughout its range.

=== Feeding ===
The white-winged warbler forages in vegetation at all levels of the forest. Its diet includes arthropods and seeds, especially those of Trema micrantha. It frequently forages in small groups and also joins mixed-species foraging flocks with other members of the family Phaenicophilidae and the Hispaniolan spindalis (Spindalis dominicensis).

=== Breeding ===
The white-winged warbler's nesting season is believed to be May to July. The only known nest was found in 2004. It was a cup of moss, leaves, lichen, and other plant material lined with small fibers and placed in a vine thicket 2.5 m (8 ft) above the ground. It contained two eggs. Nothing else is known about the species' breeding biology.

=== Vocalization ===
As of late 2022, xeno-canto had only two recordings of white-winged warbler vocalization; the Cornell Lab of Ornithology's Macaulay Library had several more. The species' song is "a series of high-pitched, squeaky notes that accelerate at the end". It also makes "a low-pitched tseep" and "a low-pitched chattering suit..suit..suit..chir..suit..suit..suit..suit..chir..chi" calls.

== Status ==
The IUCN originally assessed the white-winged warbler as Threatened but has classed it as Vulnerable since 1994. Its estimated population of 1500 to 7000 mature individuals is very fragmented and believed to be decreasing. Much of its range has been deforested, especially in Haiti. Predation by introduced small Indian mongooses is also suspected to have contributed to the decline.
