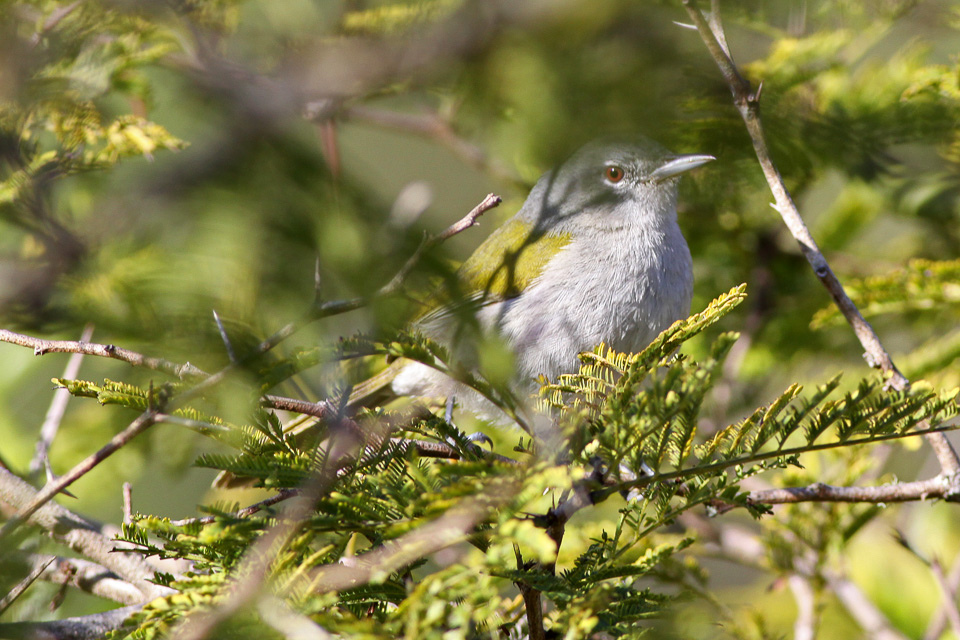

Conservation status
- Least Concern (IUCN 3.1)

Scientific classification
- Kingdom: Animalia
- Phylum: Chordata
- Class: Aves
- Order: Passeriformes
- Family: Phaenicophilidae
- Subfamily: Phaenicophilinae
- Genus: Microligea; Cory, 1884
- Species: M. palustris

Binomial name
- Microligea palustris (Cory, 1884)
- Range of M. palustris

= Green-tailed warbler =

Species of bird endemic to Hispaniola

The green-tailed warbler (Microligea palustris), also known as the green-tailed ground-tanager, is a species of bird of the family Phaenicophilidae, the Hispaniolan tanagers. It is endemic to the island of Hispaniola which is shared by Haiti and the Dominican Republic.

== Taxonomy and systematics ==
The green-tailed warbler is the only member of genus Microligea, though the white-winged warbler (Xenoligea montana) was originally also placed there. The two species were originally placed in the New World wood warbler family Parulidae, but taxonomists were unsure if they belonged there. DNA evidence published in the early 2010s showed they were not related to other wood warblers, and in 2017, they were moved to the newly created family Phaenicophilidae. The two species in the genus Phaenicophilus were also moved there from the "true" tanager family Thraupidae.

The green-tailed warbler has two subspecies: the nominate M. p. palustris, and M. p. vasta. A poorly defined population in northwestern Haiti may prove to be a third subspecies.

== Description ==
The green-tailed warbler is 12 to 14.5 cm (4.7 to 5.7 in) and weighs 9.5 to 15.2 g (0.34 to 0.54 oz). The sexes are not particularly dimorphic. Adults of the nominate subspecies have a gray head and nape, pale to dark gray lores, and white arcs above and below the eye. The eye itself is ruby red. Their upperparts are olive-green, and their underparts pale grayish that is whiter on the belly. The subspecies M. p. vasta is overall paler than the nominate and has more white on the underparts.

== Distribution and habitat ==
The nominate subspecies of the green-tailed warbler is found in the highlands of central Hispaniola that span the border between Haiti and the Dominican Republic, though it is found almost entirely in the latter country. There it inhabits broadleaf and pine montane forest with a dense understory at elevations up to about 2,900 m (9,500 ft). The subspecies M. p. vasta is a disjunct population found in the southwestern Dominican Republic lowlands and Beata Island. There, it inhabits semi-arid scrublands near sea level. There is some discussion that the mainland population belongs either to the nominate or a third subspecies, and that M. p. vasta is limited to Beata.

== Behavior ==
=== Movement ===
The green-tailed warbler is a year-round resident throughout its range.

=== Feeding ===
The green-tailed warbler forages in vegetation, usually in the undergrowth and thickets. Its diet is mostly arthropods, especially insects. It forages alone, in pairs, and in mixed-species foraging flocks.

=== Breeding ===
The green-tailed warbler's breeding season is mainly from May to June in the highlands and begins a bit earlier in the lowlands, though the species is suspected to breed at any time of year. It makes a cup nest of plant material. In the lowlands it is usually placed 1 to 2 m (3 to 7 ft) above ground, sometimes in cacti, and in the highlands can be placed as high as 10 m (30 ft). The clutch size is two to four eggs. Nothing else is known about the species' breeding biology.

=== Vocalization ===
The green-tailed warbler makes "[s]hort rasping and squeaking notes" that may accelerate into what is thought to be its song. The song has also been described as "sip sip sip".

== Status ==
The IUCN has assessed the green-tailed warbler as being of Least Concern, though its population size is unknown and believed to be decreasing. The main potential threats are continuing habitat destruction and predation by introduced small Indian mongooses. It is considered locally common.
