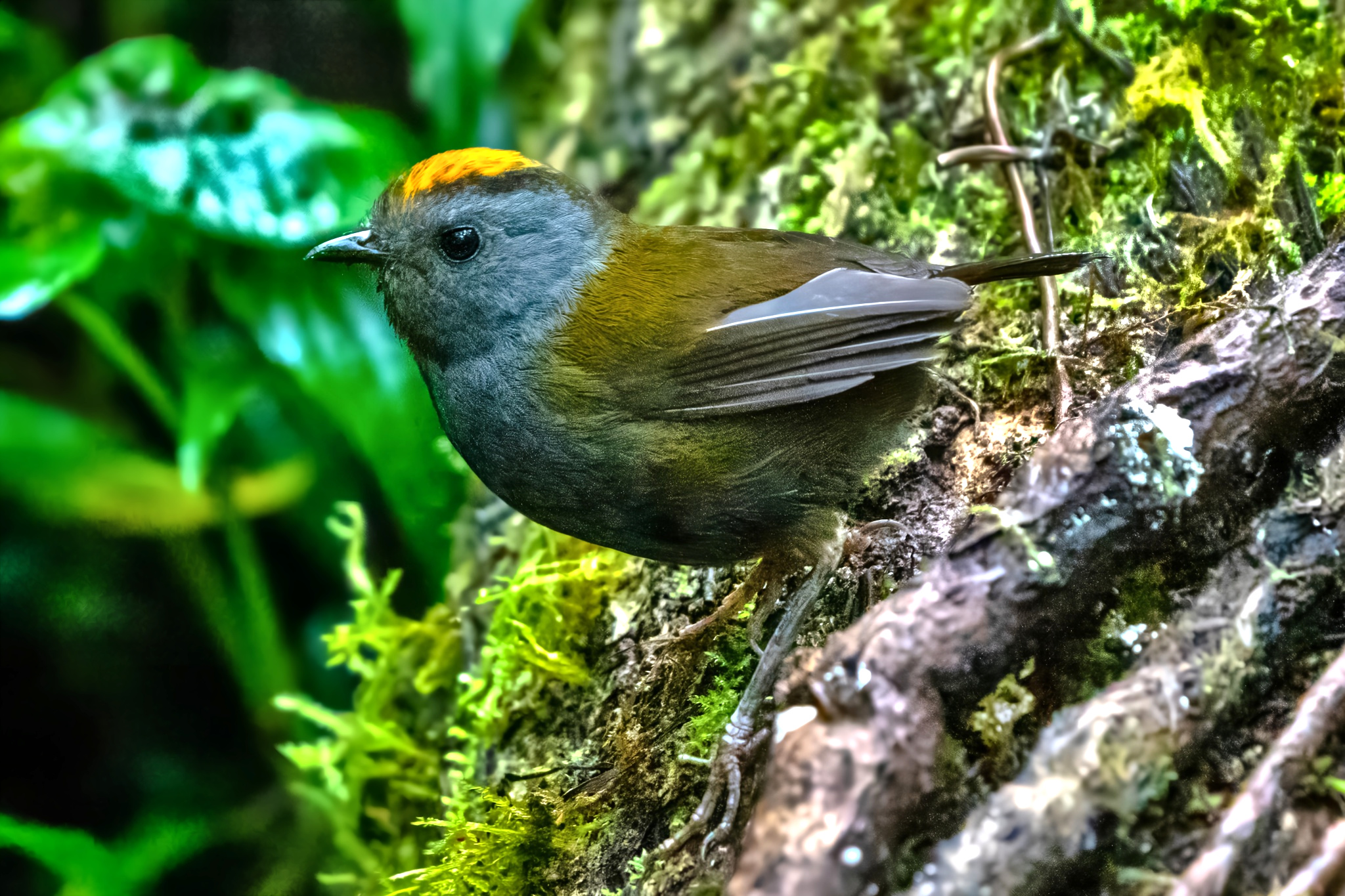

Conservation status
- Least Concern (IUCN 3.1)

Scientific classification
- Kingdom: Animalia
- Phylum: Chordata
- Class: Aves
- Order: Passeriformes
- Superfamily: Emberizoidea
- Family: Zeledoniidae; Ridgway, 1907
- Genus: Zeledonia; Ridgway, 1889
- Species: Z. coronata

Binomial name
- Zeledonia coronata Ridgway, 1889

= Wrenthrush =

Species of bird

The wrenthrush (Zeledonia coronata) or zeledonia, is a unique species of nine-primaried oscine, endemic to the Talamancan montane forests.

== Taxonomy and systematics ==
The wrenthrush is the only member of its genus and family. Despite its name, it is neither a wren (Troglodytidae) nor a thrush (Turdidae), and is not closely related to either of those families. Over time it has been treated as related to thrushes and Old World flycatchers (Muscicapidae) and by the late 20th century was placed as a member of the New World warblers (Parulidae). Phylogenetic studies of nuclear and mitochondrial DNA after that date led to reassessment of several genera and in 2017 the wrenthrush was moved to its own family. The exact placement of that family is still not firmly settled, but most taxonomic systems agree that it is closely related to the spindalises (Spindalidae), Cuban warblers (Teretistridae), Greater Antillean tanagers (Phaenicophilidae) and several other small Caribbean families, and more distantly related to New World sparrows (Passerellidae) and New World blackbirds (Icteridae). BirdLife International's Handbook of the Birds of the World places it much closer to the New World sparrows and blackbirds than do the others.

The wrenthrush's genus name commemorates José Castulo Zeledón, a Costa Rican ornithologist. It is monotypic.

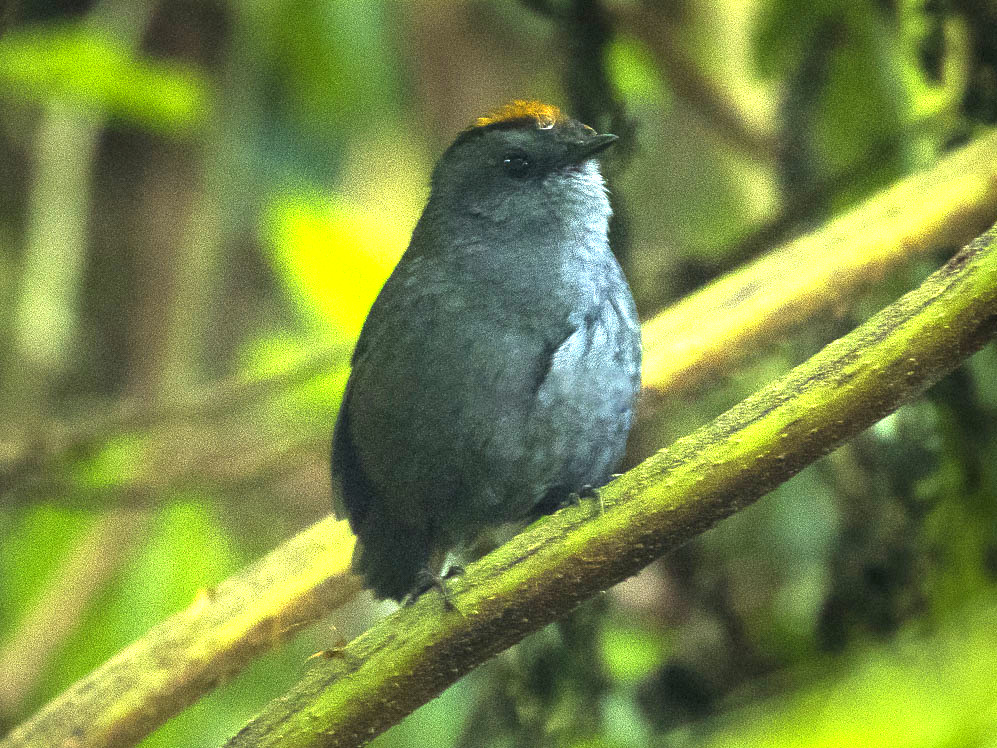
Wrenthrush in the Central Highlands of Costa Rica

== Description ==
The wrenthrush is 10 to 11.5 cm (3.9 to 4.5 in) long and weighs about 21 g (0.74 oz). It is short-tailed and rather plump, with a short thin bill somewhat like that of a Parulidae warbler. The sexes are alike. Adults have a large yellow-orange patch with black borders on their crown. Their face and the sides of their neck are leaden gray. Their upperparts, tail, and flanks are dull olive bronze. Their underparts are leaden gray with an olive tinge to the undertail coverts. Juveniles do not have the orange crown and their upperparts are more brownish than those of adults.

== Distribution and habitat ==
The wrenthrush is found from the Cordillera de Guanacaste in northern Costa Rica discontinuously through that country into western Panama's Chiriquí and Veraguas provinces. It inhabits montane evergreen forest and elfin forest, landscapes characterized by constant wetness and fog. It particularly favors dense vegetation near streams, including stands of Chusquea bamboo. In elevation it ranges from about 1,500 m (4,900 ft) up to treeline; in Costa Rica it mostly occurs around 2,500 m (8,200 ft).

== Behavior ==
=== Movement ===
The wrenthrush is essentially sedentary, with minimal elevational movement.

=== Locomotion ===
The wrenthrush is a weak flier, seldom taking to the wing and then for only short distances. It has short rounded wings and a small keel to which flight muscles attach, and there was early speculation that it is evolving towards flightlessness.

=== Feeding ===
The wrenthrush forages by hopping among branches and along the ground searching for arthropods, especially spiders and Lepidoptera larvae. It mostly forages in dense vegetation, though it occasionally works the edges of it and also hunts as high as 10 m (30 ft) above the ground in vines and epiphytes.

=== Breeding ===
The wrenthrush's breeding season appears to span from March to early July. Few nests have been found. They were domes made of moss, twigs, and leaves with a side entrance and a lining of dried leaves, grass, and moss. They were placed in cavities in earthen banks and were partially hidden by overhanging vegetation. The clutch size in three nests was three eggs. The incubation period is not known; the time from hatch to fledging appears to be at least 18 days. Both parents provision the nestlings.

=== Vocalization ===
Both sexes of wrenthrush sing, and often as a duet. They are more vocal during the breeding season, and mostly sing at dawn and dusk though they can be heard throughout the day. Their primary song is described as "ssee-del-deet with emphasis on the ending, deet", and it may be sung in a series for several minutes. Their primary call is "a thin pseee".

== Status ==
The IUCN has assessed the wrenthrush as being of Least Concern. It has a small range and its population size is unknown but believed to be stable. No immediate threats have been identified. "[H]abitat degradation and destruction could become a concern" but "its specialized high-altitude habitat seems not to be presently under threat".
