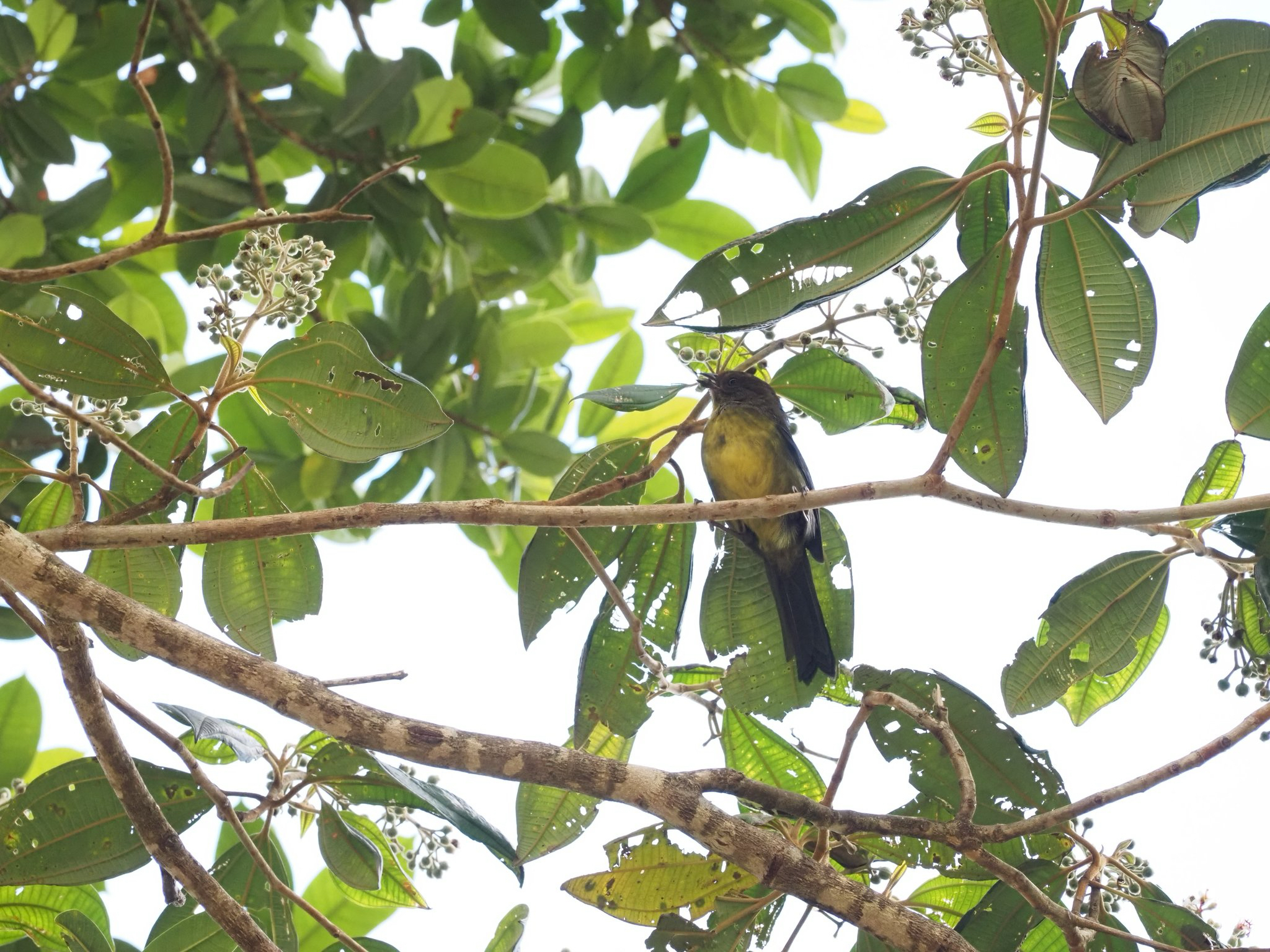

Conservation status
- Least Concern (IUCN 3.1)

Scientific classification
- Kingdom: Animalia
- Phylum: Chordata
- Class: Aves
- Order: Passeriformes
- Family: Mitrospingidae
- Genus: Mitrospingus
- Species: M. oleagineus

Binomial name
- Mitrospingus oleagineus (Salvin, 1886)

= Olive-backed tanager =

Species of bird

The olive-backed tanager (Mitrospingus oleagineus) is a species of bird in the family Mitrospingidae. It is found in Brazil, Guyana, and Venezuela.

== Taxonomy and systematics ==
The olive-backed tanager and the three other species in family Mitrospingidae were previously placed in family Thraupidae, the "true" tanagers. A 2013 publication detailed how they did not belong there and proposed the new family for them. The North and South American Classification Committees of the American Ornithological Society accepted the new placement in July 2017 and March 2019, respectively. The International Ornithological Committee (IOC) followed suit in January 2018.

The olive-backed tanager has two subspecies, the nominate Mitrospingus oleagineus oleagineus and M. o. obscuripectus.

== Description ==
The olive-backed tanager is 19 cm (7.5 in) long and weighs 35.5 to 46 g (1.25 to 1.62 oz). The nominate subspecies' forehead and face are dark gray and the throat paler gray. The head, mantle, and back are deep olive green; the breast is olive-yellow becoming brighter and more yellow on the belly. M. o. obscuripectus is very similar but the upper parts are a darker olive. The juvenile is duller and plainer than the adult and does not have the gray "mask".

== Distribution and habitat ==
The olive-backed tanager has a very small range in the area where Venezuela, Guyana, and Brazil meet. The nominate subspecies is the more eastern and is found in extreme southeastern Venezuela and the adjacent areas of west-central Guyana and far northern Brazil. M. o. obscuripectus is found in the southeastern part of Venezuela's Bolívar state and probably in adjoining Brazil.

The olive-backed tanager inhabits the slopes of tepuis (isolated mesas) in humid and wet forest, mostly in the interior of primary or secondary forest but also at the edges. In elevation it ranges between 900 and 1,800 m (3,000 and 5,900 ft).

== Behavior ==
=== Feeding ===
The olive-backed tanager forages by hopping through the understorey or mid level vegetation, primarily for insects but also for fruit. It also catches prey in "short clumsy sallies". It typically forages in flocks of its own species that may number up to 20 individuals, though it may join mixed-species flocks or be joined by other species.

=== Breeding ===
No information about the olive-backed tanager's breeding phenology has been published.

=== Vocalization ===
The olive-backed tanager's song is rendered as "zweee-eet?" or "zwee-er-eet?" that is sometimes repeatedly sounded . It makes several thin, high-pitched calls while foraging .

== Status ==
The IUCN has assessed the olive-backed tanager as being of Least Concern. It appears to be fairly common and much of its range is within Venezuela's Canaima National Park. It is "[u]nlikely to face near-term threats...".
