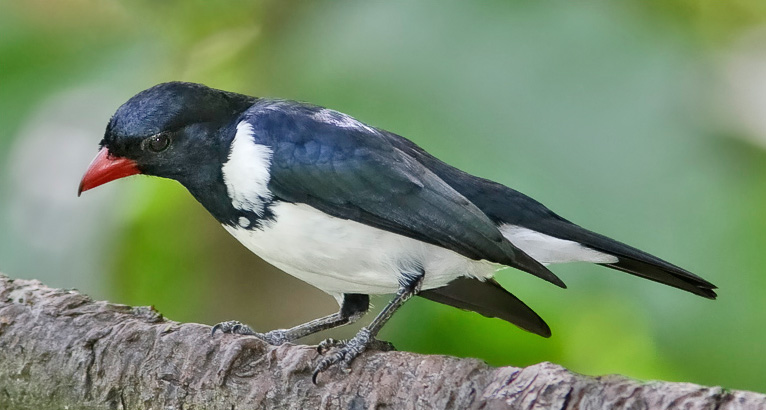
- Male

Conservation status
- Least Concern (IUCN 3.1)

Scientific classification
- Domain: Eukaryota
- Kingdom: Animalia
- Phylum: Chordata
- Class: Aves
- Order: Passeriformes
- Family: Mitrospingidae
- Genus: Lamprospiza; Cabanis, 1847
- Species: L. melanoleuca

Binomial name
- Lamprospiza melanoleuca (Vieillot, 1817)

Synonyms
- Saltator melanoleucus Vieillot, 1817; Psaris habia Lesson, 1830

= Red-billed pied tanager =

Species of bird

The red-billed pied tanager (Lamprospiza melanoleuca) is a species of bird in the family Mitrospingidae. It is found in Bolivia, Brazil, French Guiana, Guyana, Peru and Suriname. Placed in family Thraupidae, the "true" tanagers, for over two centuries, the International Ornithological Committee reclassified this species to Mitrospingidae in 2018.

== Taxonomy and systematics ==
French ornithologist Louis Pierre Vieillot described the red-billed pied tanager as Saltator melanoleucus in 1817. In 1823, English ornithologist John Latham called it the divaricated tanager, having seen a specimen in Lord Stanley's collection. French naturalist René Lesson called it Psaris habia in his work Centurie zoologique. English ornithologist George Robert Gray followed on by placing in the genus Tityra as T. habia in his Genera of Birds. German ornithologist Jean Cabanis defined the genus Lamprospiza in 1847, giving it the binomial name of Lamprospiza habia. Finally English zoologist Philip Sclater gave it its current name in 1856, synonymising the species descriptions to date.

The red-billed pied tanager and the three other species in family Mitrospingidae were previously placed in family Thraupidae, the "true" tanagers. A 2013 publication detailed how they did not belong there and proposed the new family for them. The North and South American Classification Committees of the American Ornithological Society accepted the new placement in July 2017 and March 2019, respectively. The International Ornithological Committee (IOC) followed suit in January 2018.

The red-billed pied tanager is the only member of its genus and has no subspecies.

== Description ==
The red-billed pied tanager is 17 to 18 cm (6.7 to 7.1 in) long and weighs 24 to 42 g (0.85 to 1.48 oz). The male's head and upper parts are glossy blue-black, its throat and chest black, and the rest of the underparts white. The female is similar but the nape, back, and rump are gray. Both have the eponymous red bill. The juvenile is quite different; it has a black bill and head. Its upper back is white and the lower back mottled black and white. The underparts are white with some black mixed in.

== Distribution and habitat ==
The red-billed pied tanager is found in the upper Amazon Basin from eastern and southeastern Peru and northern Bolivia east to central Brazil and north into the Guianas. There it inhabits the canopy and emergent trees of humid terra firme forest up to about 900 m (3,000 ft) elevation. It can also be found on the edges of the forest.

== Behavior ==
=== Feeding ===
The red-billed pied tanager's diet includes berries, seeds, beetles, and Cecropia catkins. It typically forages in groups of three to eight individuals that may associate with mixed-species feeding flocks. It hops between branches and occasionally sallies out for flying prey.

=== Breeding ===
Very little has been published about the red-billed pied tanager's breeding phenology. A female was seen on a nest in Brazil's Amazonas state in February. Fledged young were seen in Mato Grosso in June and in Amazonas in September.

=== Vocalization ===
The red-billed pied tanager's song is complex, "a semi-musical but jumbled series". Flocks give a call rendered as "ééé-ééh...ééé-ééé-ééh...ééé-ééh-yuu...".

== Status ==
The IUCN has assessed the red-billed pied tanager as being of Least Concern. It has a "reasonably large range, and no obvious threats."
