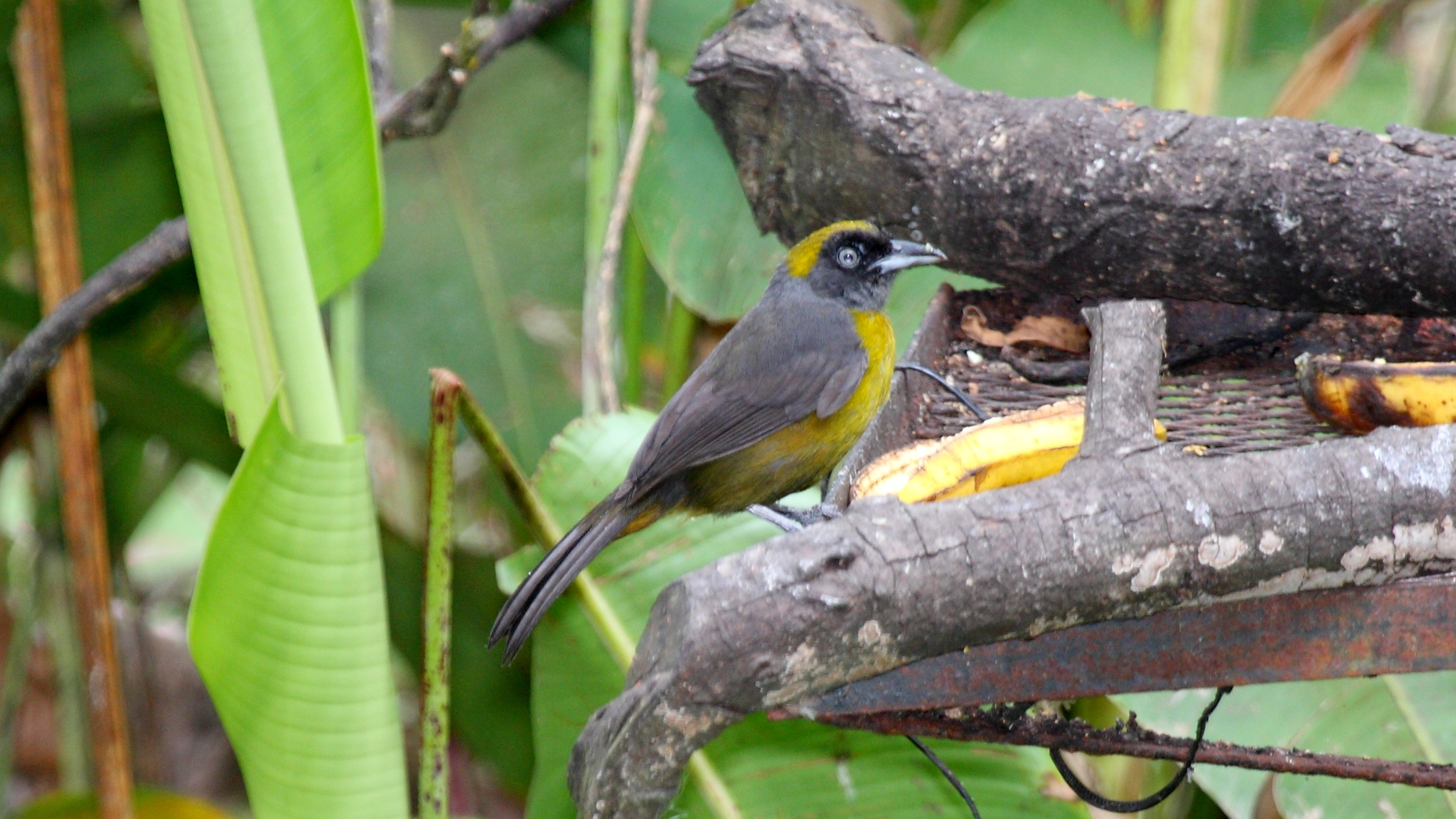
- Dusky-faced tanager (Mitrospingus cassinii)

Scientific classification
- Kingdom: Animalia
- Phylum: Chordata
- Class: Aves
- Order: Passeriformes
- Family: Mitrospingidae
- Genus: Mitrospingus; Ridgway, 1898

Type species
- Tachyphonus cassinii Lawrence, 1861

= Mitrospingus =

Genus of birds

Mitrospingus is a genus of bird formerly in the family Thraupidae. Established by Robert Ridgway in 1898, it contains the following two species:

Image	Scientific name	Common name	Distribution
	Mitrospingus cassinii	Dusky-faced tanager	Colombia, Costa Rica, Ecuador, Panama, and Venezuela
	Mitrospingus oleagineus	Olive-backed tanager	Brazil, Guyana, and Venezuela

The name Mitrospingus is a combination of the Greek words mitra meaning "cap" or "head-dress" and spingos, meaning "finch".
