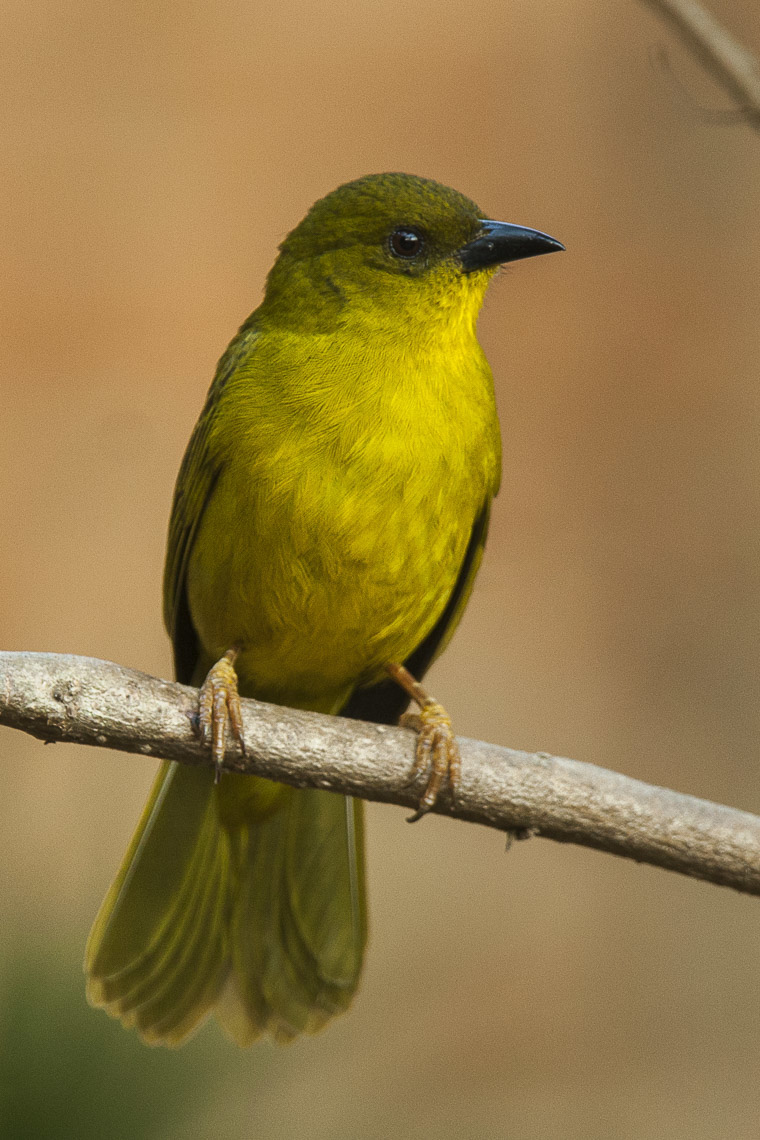

Conservation status
- Least Concern (IUCN 3.1)

Scientific classification
- Kingdom: Animalia
- Phylum: Chordata
- Class: Aves
- Order: Passeriformes
- Family: Mitrospingidae
- Genus: Orthogonys; Strickland, 1844
- Species: O. chloricterus

Binomial name
- Orthogonys chloricterus (Vieillot, 1819)

= Olive-green tanager =

Species of bird in Brazil

The olive-green tanager (Orthogonys chloricterus) is a species of bird in the family Mitrospingidae. It is endemic to Brazil. (Note: Gill, F.; Donsker, D.; Rasmussen, P., eds. (2022-02-01). "IOC World Bird List (v 12.1)".)

== Taxonomy and systematics ==
The olive-green tanager and the three other species in family Mitrospingidae were previously placed in family Thraupidae, the "true" tanagers. A 2013 publication detailed how they did not belong there and proposed the new family for them. The North and South American Classification Committees of the American Ornithological Society accepted the new placement in July 2017 and March 2019, respectively. The International Ornithological Committee (IOC) followed suit in January 2018.

The olive-green tanager is the only member of its genus and has no subspecies.

== Description ==
The olive-green tanager is 18 to 19 cm (7.1 to 7.5 in) long. The adult is olive green above and dull yellow below; it has a tinge of olive on the sides and flanks. (Note: Hilty, Steven; Juana, Eduardo de (2020-03-04). Hoyo, J. del; Elliott, A.; Sargatal, J.; Christie, D. A.; Juana, E. de (eds.). "Olive-green Tanager (Orthogonys chloricterus), version 1.0". Birds of the World. Ithaca, New York: Cornell Lab of Ornithology. doi:10.2173/bow.olgtan1.01. S2CID 216225042.)

== Distribution and habitat ==
The olive-green tanager is found only in southeastern Brazil, from Espírito Santo state south to eastern Santa Catarina and northeastern Rio Grande do Sul. It inhabits the interior and edges of humid montane forest at elevations of 900 to 1,800 m (3,000 to 5,900 ft).

== Behavior ==
=== Feeding ===
The olive-green tanager's diet is primarily insects, though it also eats fruit. It typically forages in flocks of its own species that may number up to 20 individuals but more usually have about eight. It feeds in the mid- to upper levels of the forest, usually picking prey from leaves, and it also sallies for flying insects.

=== Breeding ===
One olive-green tanager was noted carrying nest material to a bromeliad in a large tree. No other information has been published about its breeding phenology.

=== Vocalization ===
The olive-green tanager's song has been rendered as "tséé-si, si, si, tséé-si, si, si." Its call is a buzzy "tseee" and it also calls "wheek!" while foraging.

== Status ==
The IUCN has assessed the olive-green tanager as being of Least Concern. "Despite local population declines and fragmentation, its long-term viability should be assured if protection continues for the parks and reserves where it remains."
