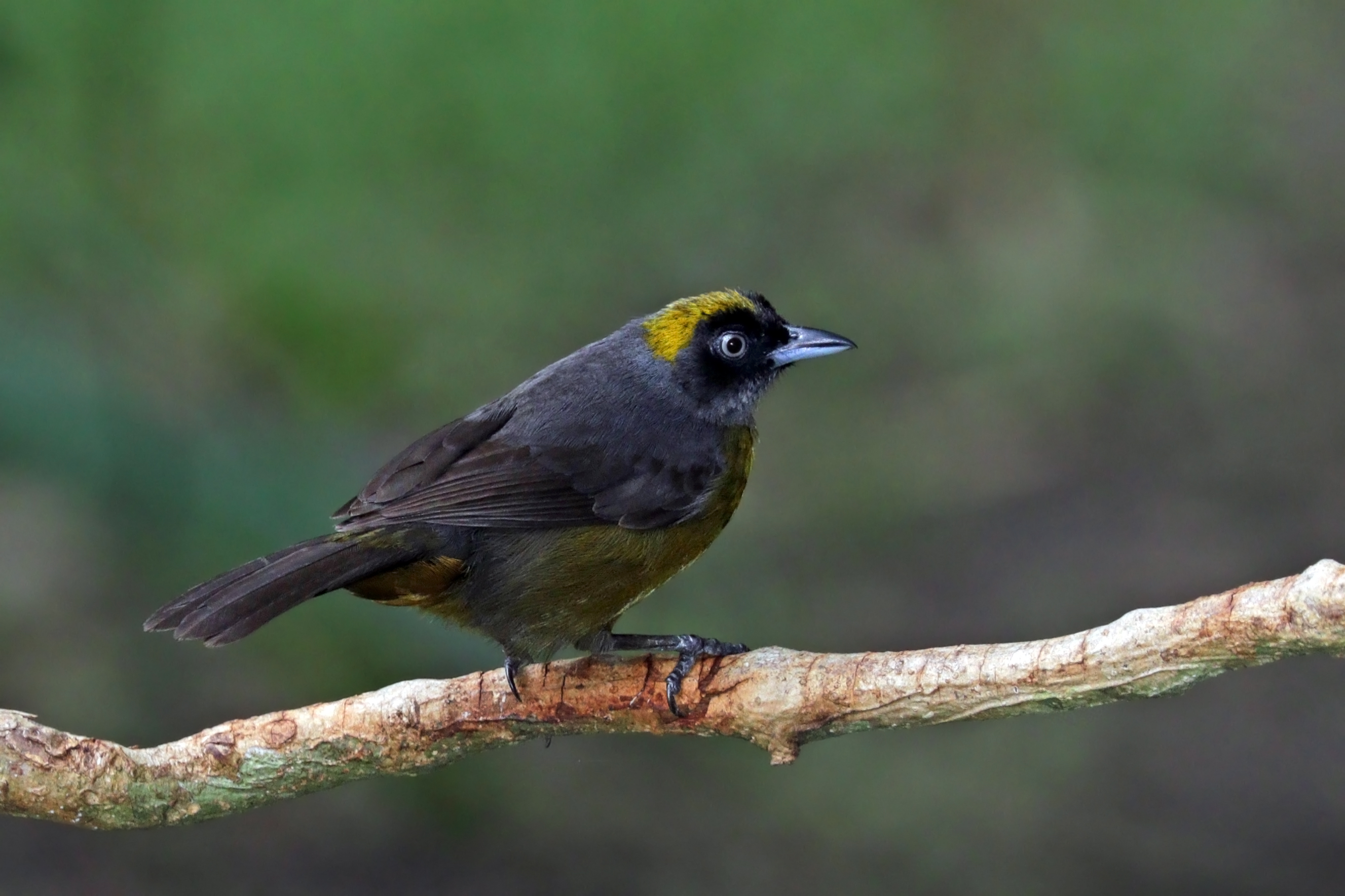
- Mitrospingus cassinii cassinii, Panama

Conservation status
- Least Concern (IUCN 3.1)

Scientific classification
- Kingdom: Animalia
- Phylum: Chordata
- Class: Aves
- Order: Passeriformes
- Family: Mitrospingidae
- Genus: Mitrospingus
- Species: M. cassinii

Binomial name
- Mitrospingus cassinii (Lawrence, 1861)

= Dusky-faced tanager =

Species of bird

The dusky-faced tanager (Mitrospingus cassinii) is a species of bird in the family Mitrospingidae. It is found in Colombia, Costa Rica, Ecuador, and Panama.

== Taxonomy and systematics ==
The dusky-faced tanager and the three other species in family Mitrospingidae were previously placed in family Thraupidae, the "true" tanagers. A 2013 publication detailed how they did not belong there and proposed the new family for them. The North and South American Classification Committees of the American Ornithological Society accepted the new placement in July 2017 and March 2019, respectively. The International Ornithological Committee (IOC) followed suit in January 2018.

The dusky-faced tanager has two subspecies, the nominate Mitrospingus cassinii cassinii and M. c. costaricensis.

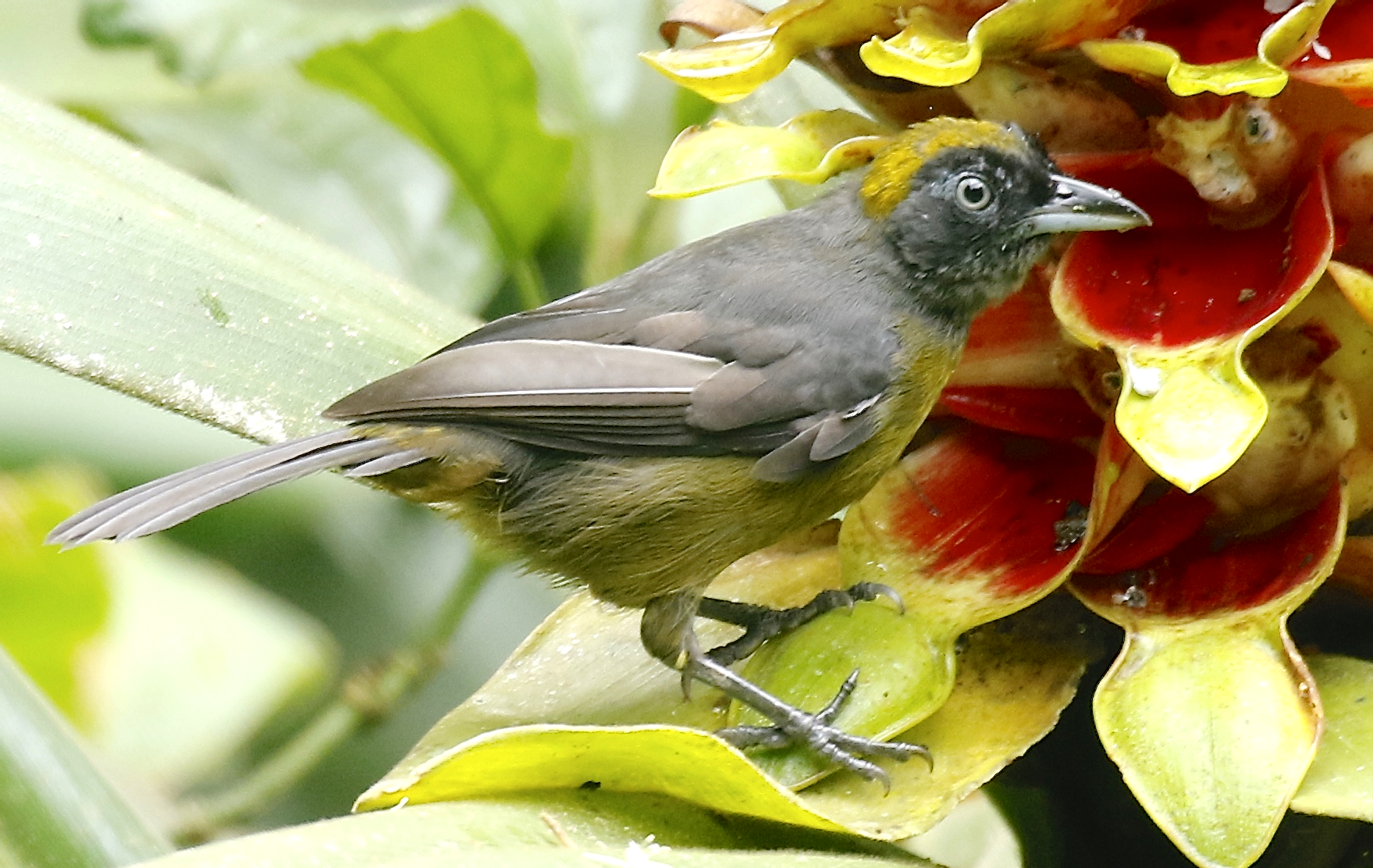
Canopy Lodge - El Valle, Panama

== Description ==
The two subspecies are "very poorly differentiated." The adults are 18 to 18.5 cm (7.1 to 7.3 in) long and weigh 32 to 39 g (1.1 to 1.4 oz). Their crown and nape are mustard yellow. The face has a large black "mask". Their upper parts are lead gray. The throat is light gray transitioning to olive yellow on the breast and flanks and further to a gray-olive-yellow blend on the belly. The juvenile is similar but has less yellow on the crown and a buffy tinge to the underparts.

== Distribution and habitat ==
The dusky-faced tanager of subspecies M. c. costaricensis is found along the Caribbean coast from Costa Rica's Heredia Province south to extreme northwestern Panama. The nominate is found on both slopes of western Panama south through western Colombia to Guayas Province in Ecuador. It also occurs on the east slope of Colombia's Central Andes.

The dusky-face tanager inhabits low dense shrubbery, thickets, and second growth. It is found along forest edges, gaps in forest, and along forest streams and swampy areas. In Costa Rica it generally ranges up to 300 m (980 ft) but can be found up to 600 m (2,000 ft). Its upper limit in Panama is 1,200 m (3,900 ft). In Colombia it is mostly below 800 m (2,600 ft) though it has been recorded up to 1,100 m (3,600 ft). In Ecuador it can be found as high as 800 m (2,600 ft).

== Behavior ==
=== Feeding ===
The dusky-faced tanager appears to primarily eat fruits, though it also eats insects and seeds.

=== Breeding ===
The dusky-faced tanager's breeding phenology has not been thoroughly studied. Breeding or breeding-condition birds have been recorded between March and May from Costa Rica, Panama, and Colombia. Two well-described nests were cups suspended in shrubs. The apparent clutch size is two, and nestlings were attended by at least three adults.

=== Vocalization ===
The dusky-faced tanager's dawn song is "seety, seety, seety, seety, seety" . They chatter all day long with "sputtering notes such as chet or chet-ut" .

== Status ==
The IUCN has assessed the dusky-faced tanager as being of Least Concern. It has a large range and the population appears to be stable. It occurs in several protected areas.
