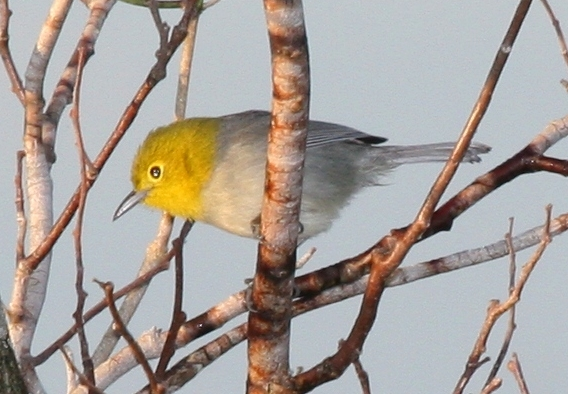

Conservation status
- Least Concern (IUCN 3.1)

Scientific classification
- Kingdom: Animalia
- Phylum: Chordata
- Class: Aves
- Order: Passeriformes
- Family: Teretistridae
- Genus: Teretistris
- Species: T. fernandinae

Binomial name
- Teretistris fernandinae (Lembeye, 1850)
- Teretistris fernandinae range

= Yellow-headed warbler =

Species of bird

The yellow-headed warbler (Teretistris fernandinae) is one of two species of bird in the Cuban warbler family Teretistridae. It is endemic to western Cuba.

== Taxonomy and systematics ==
The yellow-headed warbler shares its family and genus with the Oriente warbler (T. fornsi). They were originally placed in the New World warblers (Parulidae) but phylogenetic studies of nuclear and mitochondrial DNA led to reassessment of several genera and in 2017 the Cuban warblers were moved to their own family. Their closest relatives are the four members of family Spindalidae, the yellow-breasted chat (Icteria virens), and the New World blackbirds of family Icteridae.

The yellow-headed warbler is monotypic.

== Description ==
The yellow-headed warbler is about 13 cm (5.1 in) long and weighs 6 to 18.5 g (0.21 to 0.65 oz). Its entire head is yellow, with an olive tinge on the crown and nape. Its upperparts are gray and its underparts a lighter grayish white.

== Distribution and habitat ==
The yellow-headed warbler is found in far western mainland Cuba, Isla de la Juventud (Isle of Pines), and the nearby Cayo Cantiles. It inhabits all available forest types as long as they have a relatively undisturbed understory, and also scrubby thickets in drier areas. In elevation it ranges from lowlands to high mountains.

== Behavior ==
=== Movement ===
The yellow-headed warbler is a year-round resident throughout its range.

=== Feeding ===
The yellow-headed warbler forages from the ground to the forest mid-level, gleaning rocks and foliage for insects and other invertebrates. It is also believed to take small lizards. It often forages in flocks.

=== Breeding ===
The yellow-headed warbler's breeding season is from March to July, with eggs laid in April and May. It makes a cup nest of grass, rootlets, and other plant fibers and usually places it fairly low in a bush, vine, or sapling. The clutch size is two or three eggs. The incubation period and time to fledging are not known.

=== Vocalization ===
The yellow-headed warbler's song is "a series of buzzy grating notes interspersed with sweeter, more musical notes". Its calls include "a rapid, high-pitched, staccato chattering" and "various other buzzy and grating notes".

== Status ==
The IUCN has assessed the yellow-headed warbler as being of Least Concern. It has a small range and its population size is unknown but believed to be stable. No immeditate threats have been identified. It is considered common to very common within its range.
