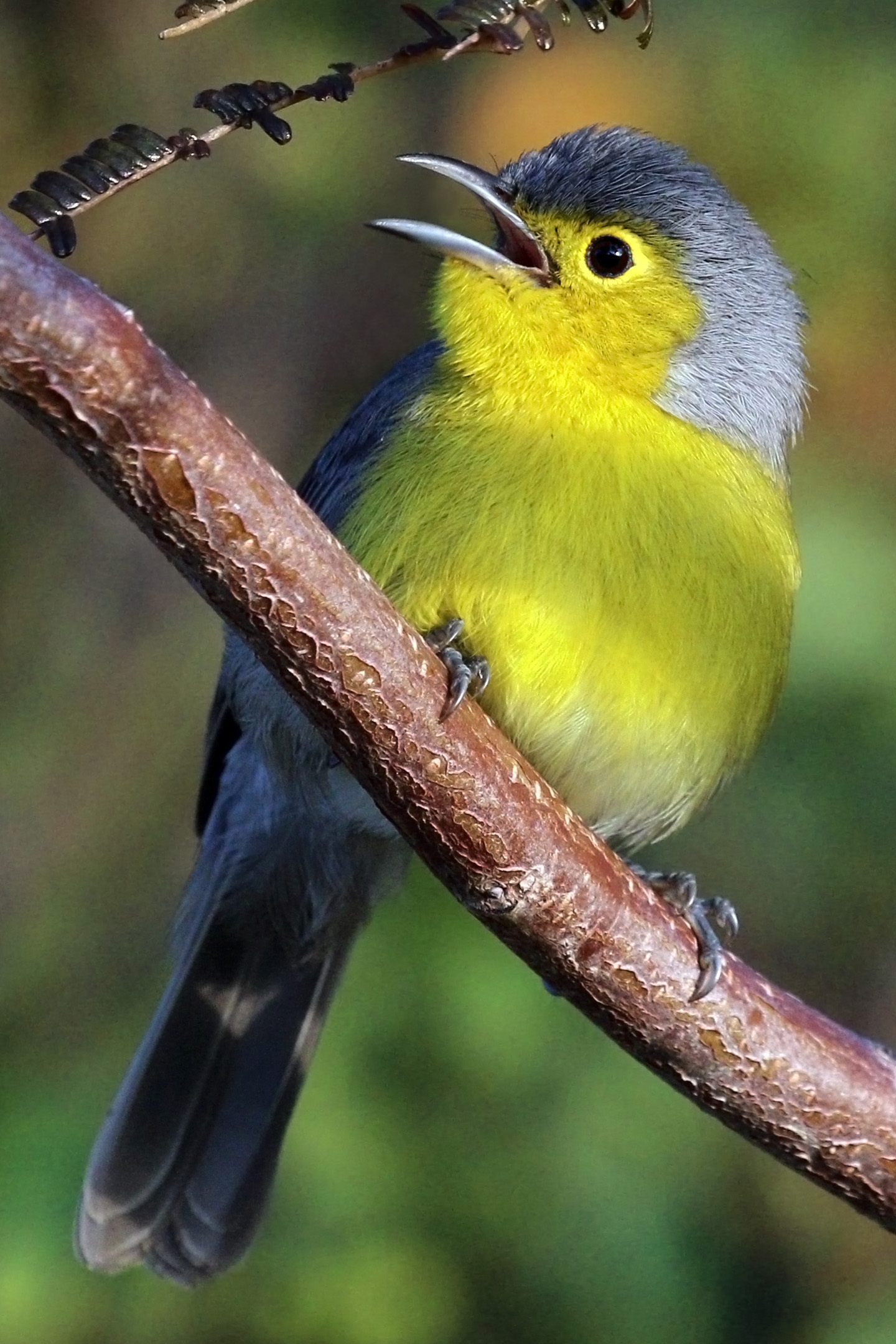
- Cayo Romano, Cuba

Conservation status
- Least Concern (IUCN 3.1)

Scientific classification
- Kingdom: Animalia
- Phylum: Chordata
- Class: Aves
- Order: Passeriformes
- Family: Teretistridae
- Genus: Teretistris
- Species: T. fornsi

Binomial name
- Teretistris fornsi Gundlach, 1858
- Range of T. fornsi

= Oriente warbler =

Species of bird

The Oriente warbler (Teretistris fornsi) is one of two species of bird in the Cuban warbler family Teretistridae. It is endemic to central and eastern Cuba.

== Taxonomy and systematics ==
The Oriente warbler shares its family and genus with the yellow-headed warbler (T. fernandinae). They were originally placed in the New World warblers (Parulidae) but phylogenetic studies of nuclear and mitochondrial DNA led to reassessment of several genera and in 2017 the Cuban warblers were moved to their own family. Their closest relatives are the four members of family Spindalidae, the yellow-breasted chat (Icteria virens), and the New World blackbirds of family Icteridae.

The Oriente warbler has two subspecies, the nominate T. f. fornsi and T. f. turquinensis.

== Description ==
The Oriente warbler is about 13 cm (5.1 in) long and weighs 7.4 to 13 g (0.26 to 0.46 oz). The nominate subspecies has a gray crown, nape, and upperparts. Its face, throat, and most of its underparts are yellow; its belly and undertail coverts are white and its flanks have a dull brownish wash. Subspecies T. f. turquinensis is slightly larger than the nominate; its crown and upperparts are sooty gray and the wash on its flanks is gray rather than brownish.

== Distribution and habitat ==
The nominate subspecies of Oriente warbler is found in the mountains and coast of eastern Cuba and the Sabana-Camagüey Archipelago off the main island's north coast. T. f. turquinensis is found in the Sierra Maestra along the southeastern Cuban coast. It inhabits all available forest types as long as they have a relatively undisturbed understory, and also scrubby thickets in drier areas. In elevation it ranges from sea level to almost 2,000 m (6,600 ft). It tends to occur in scrubby semi-arid woodlands near the coast and in more humid forest at higher elevations.

== Behavior ==
=== Movement ===
The Oriente warbler is a year-round resident throughout its range.

=== Feeding ===
The Oriente warbler forages from the ground to the forest mid-level, mainly by gleaning but also by hover-gleaning and probing bark and clumps of dead leaves. Its major prey is beetles (Coleoptera) but it feeds on other insects, other invertebrates, small lizards, and possibly small fruits. In the non-breeding season it often forages in flocks of up to about 15 of its species, which can be the nucleus of mixed-species foraging flocks.

=== Breeding ===
The Oriente warbler's breeding season is from March to July, with eggs laid in March and April. It makes a nest of moss, grass, rootlets, and other plant fibers. It usually places it in a clump of Tillandsia (an epiphyte) about 1 m (3 ft) up on a branch or fork. The clutch is two or three eggs. The incubation period is eight or nine days and fledging occurs 10 to 11 days after hatch.

=== Vocalization ===
The Oriente warbler's song is " a series of buzzy notes interspersed with sweeter notes". Its calls include a "sharp 'tchip'."

== Status ==
The IUCN has assessed the Oriente warbler as being of Least Concern. It has a small range and its population size is unknown but believed to be stable. No immediate threats have been identified. It is "probably common within its limited and rather discontinuous range."
