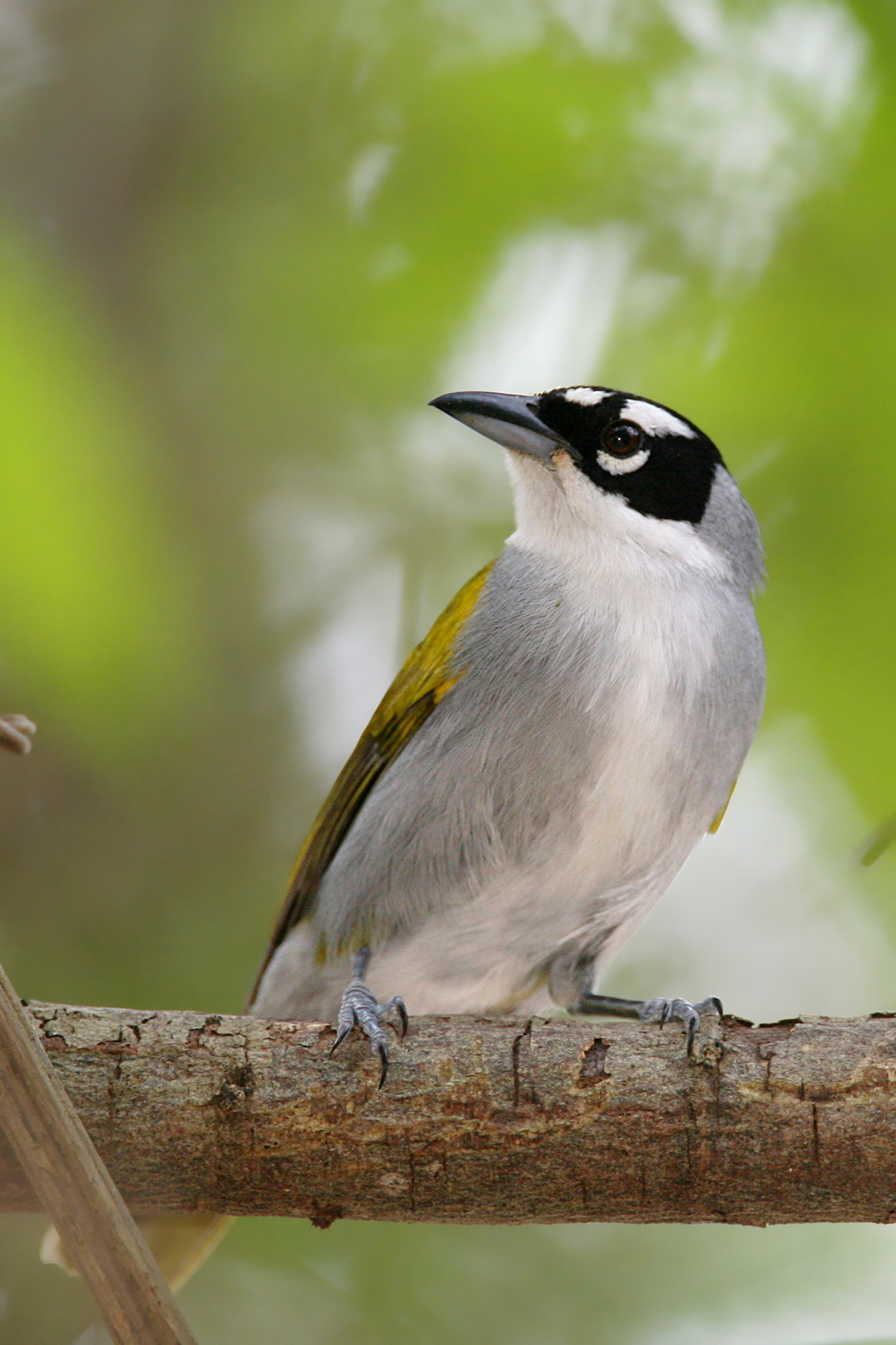

Conservation status
- Least Concern (IUCN 3.1)

Scientific classification
- Kingdom: Animalia
- Phylum: Chordata
- Class: Aves
- Order: Passeriformes
- Family: Phaenicophilidae
- Genus: Phaenicophilus
- Species: P. palmarum

Binomial name
- Phaenicophilus palmarum (Linnaeus, 1766)
- Range in green

Synonyms
- Turdus palmarum Linnaeus, 1766

= Black-crowned palm-tanager =

Species of bird endemic to Hispaniola

The black-crowned palm-tanager or black-crowned tanager (Phaenicophilus palmarum) is a species of bird of the family Phaenicophilidae, the Hispaniolan palm-tanagers. It is endemic to the island of Hispaniola which is shared by Haiti and the Dominican Republic.

== Taxonomy and systematics ==
In 1760, the French zoologist Mathurin Jacques Brisson included a description of the black-crowned palm-tanager in his Ornithologie. He used the French name Le palmiste and the Latin name Merula palmarum. Although Brisson coined Latin names, these do not conform to the binomial system, and are not recognised by the International Commission on Zoological Nomenclature. When the Swedish naturalist Carl Linnaeus updated his Systema Naturae for the twelfth edition in 1766, he added 240 species that had been previously described by Brisson; one of them was the black-crowned palm-tanager. Linnaeus included a brief description, coined the binomial name Turdus palmarum and cited Brisson's work. The specific name palmarum is the Latin for "of palm trees". The species is now placed in the genus Phaenicophilus that was introduced by the English geologist and naturalist Hugh Edwin Strickland in 1851.

The black-crowned palm-tanager shares its genus with the grey-crowned palm-tanager (P. poliocephalus). They hybridize, and have at times been considered conspecific. The genus was long included in family Thraupidae, the "true" tanagers, but it was moved in 2017. The black-crowned palm-tanager is monotypic.

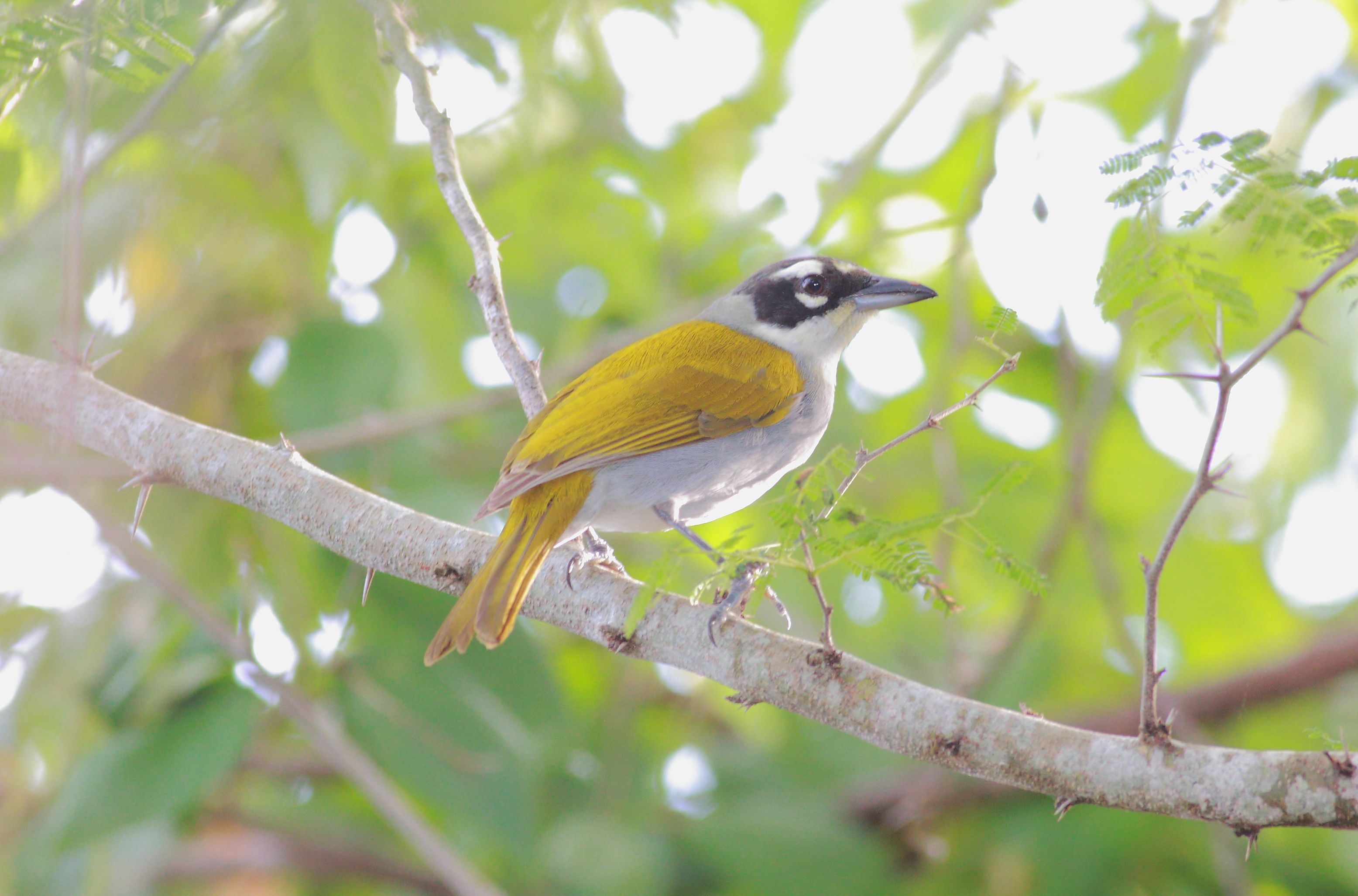
Near La Romana, Dominican Republic

== Description ==
The black-crowned palm-tanager is 17 to 18 cm (6.7 to 7.1 in) long and weighs about 24 to 32 g (0.85 to 1.1 oz). The sexes are not particularly dimorphic. The species has a long, strong, sharply pointed bill with a black maxilla, and a blue-gray mandible with a black tip. The adults' head is mostly black with a white patch above the bill, a larger white patch above and beyond its red-brown eye, and a thin arc of white below its eye. Its nape is gray and the rest of the upperparts, including the tail, are bright yellowish olive. Its throat and the middle of the breast are white; the sides of its breast and its flanks, belly, and undertail coverts are gray. Immatures have a dusky gray head instead of black and a buff tinge to the throat.

== Distribution and habitat ==
The black-crowned palm-tanager is found throughout the mainland Dominican Republic (including on Saona Island) and in Haiti (except for the Tiburon Peninsula). It inhabits almost every landscape on Hispaniola, in many forest types from dry to humid and open to dense. It also occurs in rural and urban gardens and parks. In elevation it ranges from sea level to about 2,500 m (8,200 ft) but is most common well below 2,000 m (6,600 ft).

== Behavior ==
=== Movement ===
The black-crowned palm-tanager is a year-round resident throughout its range.

=== Feeding ===
The black-crowned palm-tanager forages in pairs or family groups at all levels of the forest and also sometimes joins mixed-species foraging flocks. Its diet is about 2/3 insects and 1/3 fruit with a small amount of nectar also taken.

=== Breeding ===
The black-crowned palm-tanager's breeding season is from April to June. It makes a deep unlined cup nest in a tree or bush, often near human habitations. The clutch is two to three eggs; the incubation period is about 10 days and time to fledging another 10 days.

=== Vocalization ===
The black-crowned palm-tanager's song varies across its range. It is generally "jumbled squeaky notes that grow louder, then diminish and slow to short 'chit' notes". Some populations include raspy and buzzy phrases. Its calls include a "nasal, buzzy 'pe-u'...[a] higher, more penetrating 'tseep'...[and] also a low 'chep'."

== Status ==
The IUCN has assessed the black-crowned palm-tanager as being of Least Concern. It has a large range, and though its population size is unknown it is believed to be stable. No immediate threats have been identified. It is considered common throughout its range, occurs in many protected areas, and has "successfully adapted to human-altered environments".
