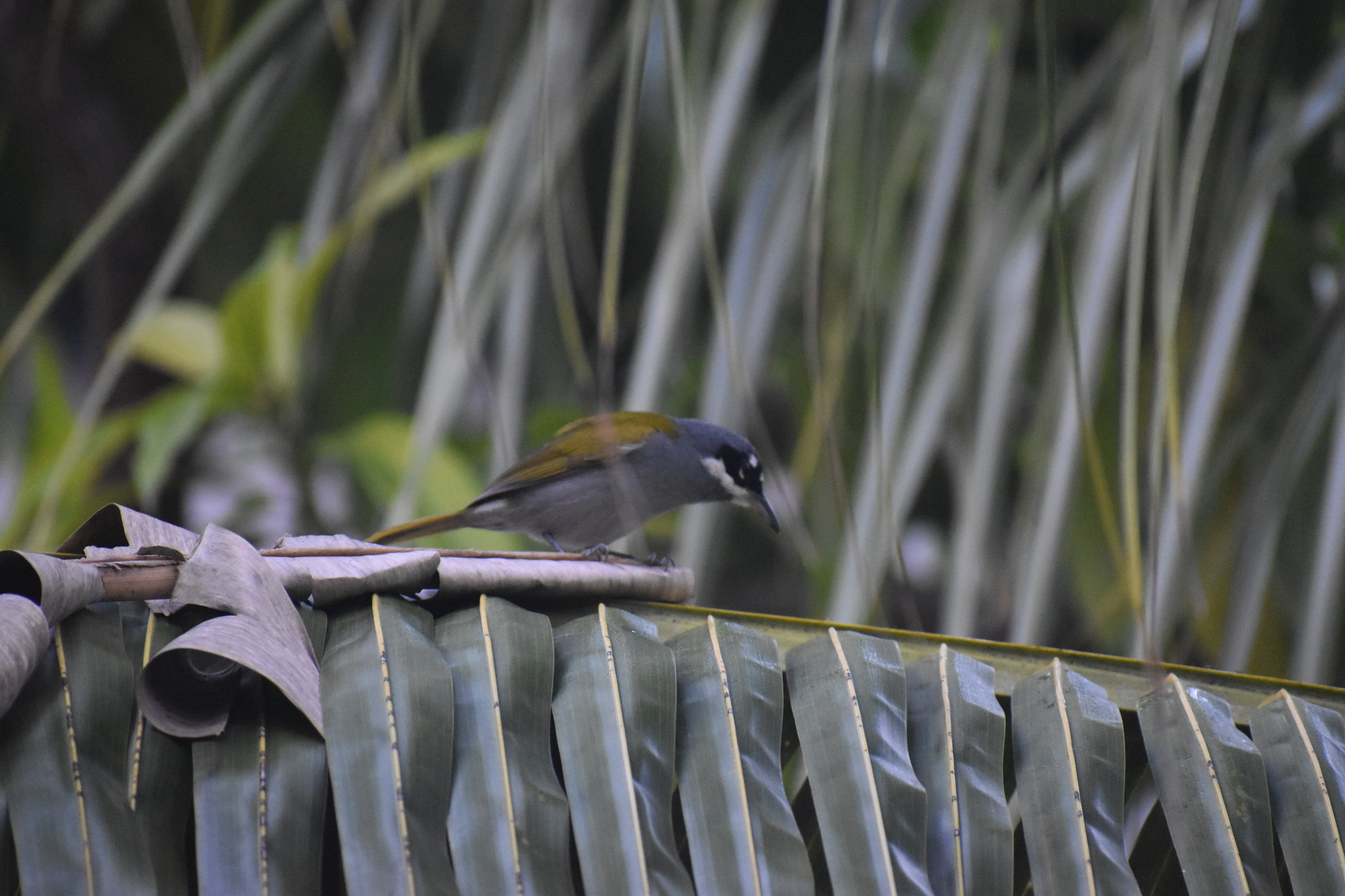

Conservation status
- Near Threatened (IUCN 3.1)

Scientific classification
- Kingdom: Animalia
- Phylum: Chordata
- Class: Aves
- Order: Passeriformes
- Family: Phaenicophilidae
- Genus: Phaenicophilus
- Species: P. poliocephalus

Binomial name
- Phaenicophilus poliocephalus (Bonaparte, 1851)
- Range in green

= Grey-crowned palm-tanager =

Species of bird endemic to Hispaniola

The grey-crowned palm-tanager or grey-crowned tanager (Phaenicophilus poliocephalus) is a Near Threatened species of bird in the family Phaenicophilidae, the Hispaniolan palm-tanagers. It is endemic to the Caribbean island of Hispaniola, in both the Dominican Republic and Haiti.

== Taxonomy and systematics ==
The grey-crowned palm-tanager shares its genus with the black-crowned palm-tanager (P. palmarum). They hybridize and have at times been considered conspecific. The genus was long included in family Thraupidae, the "true" tanagers, but it was moved in 2017.

The International Ornithological Committee and BirdLife International's Handbook of the Birds of the World assign three subspecies to the grey-crowned palm-tanager, the nominate P. p. poliocephalus, P. p. coryi, and P. p. tetraopes. The Clements taxonomy includes tetraopes within the nominate. This article follows the three-subspecies model.

== Description ==
The grey-crowned palm-tanager is about 18 cm (7.1 in) long and weighs about 27 g (0.95 oz). The sexes are alike. The nominate subspecies has a deep gray crown and a black "mask" with white spots in front of, above, and below the eye. Its upperparts are yellow-green. Its throat is bright white and the rest of its underparts the same dark gray as the crown. Subspecies P. p. coryi is larger than the nominate and paler overall with a white streak down the center of the breast and belly. P. p. tetraopes is slightly paler than the nominate both top and bottom.

== Distribution and habitat ==
The grey-crowned palm-tanager's nominate subspecies is found on the Tiburon Peninsula of southwestern Haiti and the small island of Grande Cayemite off its northern shore. In the Dominican Republic, it is rarely found in the north and south slopes of the Sierra de Baoruco, as well as on the southern part of Loma de Toro and Hoyo de Pelempito. The subspecies P. p. tetraopes is found only on Île-à-Vache off the Tiburon Peninsula's south coast. P. p. coryi is found only on Gonâve Island in the Gulf of Gonâve north of the peninsula. The species inhabits every available forest type from dry to wet and open to dense. It also occurs tree plantations and in rural and urban gardens and parks. It is most easily viewed on the Massif de la Hotte towards the western end of the Tiburon Peninsula. In elevation it ranges from sea level to 2,400 m (7,900 ft).

== Behavior ==
=== Movement ===
The grey-crowned palm-tanager is a year-round resident throughout its range.

=== Feeding ===
The grey-crowned palm-tanager forages in pairs or family groups from the forest mid-level to the canopy, and also sometimes joins mixed-species foraging flocks. Its major dietary component is small arthropods with a lesser contribution from fruit. It forages for arthropods mostly by gleaning from foliage, both living and dead.

=== Breeding ===
The grey-crowned palm-tanager's breeding season is from May to July. It builds a cup nest of twigs up to about 9 m (30 ft) above ground. The clutch size is two to four eggs. After young fledge, the family stays together for several months. Nothing else is known about its breeding biology.

=== Vocalization ===
As of late 2022 xeno-canto had no recordings of grey-crowned palm-tanager vocalizations and the Cornell Lab of Ornithology's Macaulay Library had very few. It has "an extended melodic song" and a "peee-u" call.

== Status ==
The IUCN has assessed the grey-crowned palm-tanager as Near Threatened. It has a limited range and an unknown population size that is believed to be decreasing. Deforestation in the Dominican Republic and especially Haiti has been severe and is continuing. However, the palm-tanager is common in areas of remaining habitat. "The small amount of forest left on Hispaniola is under constant pressure [but the species'] generalist habits likely buffer it to some extent from the effects of deforestation".
