= Puerto Rican tanager =

Conservation status
- Vulnerable (IUCN 3.1)

Scientific classification
- Kingdom: Animalia
- Phylum: Chordata
- Class: Aves
- Order: Passeriformes
- Family: Phaenicophilidae
- Subfamily: Spindalinae
- Genus: Nesospingus; P.L. Sclater, 1885
- Species: N. speculiferus

Binomial name
- Nesospingus speculiferus (Lawrence, 1875)

Species of bird

The Puerto Rican tanager (Nesospingus speculiferus) is a small passerine bird endemic to the archipelago of Puerto Rico. It is the only member of the genus Nesospingus and has historically been placed in the tanager family, but recent studies indicate it as either belonging in the family Phaenicophilidae. Its closest relatives are likely the spindalises. The Puerto Rican tanager is known to locals as llorosa, which means 'cryer'.

== Description ==
=== Identification ===
The Puerto Rican tanager is a small passerine, typically measuring between 18 and 20 cm (7 and 8 in) in length and weighing around 36 g (1.3 oz). Both males and females are olive-brown above with pale grey to white underparts. Adults typically have faint dusky striping on the breast and pure white throats. Adults also have a conspicuous white spot on the wing and a dark crown and face which obscures the eye. Undertail coverts are pale fulvous. Males have a brown-black maxilla and white mandible and females have entirely black bills. Immatures are similar in appearance to adults, but are brownish underneath and lack the white wing spot.

=== Voice ===
The most frequently heard noise emitted by the Puerto Rican tanager is a harsh call note often described as a chewp or chuck. This is often heard while feeding in flocks and may be extended into a longer chi-chi-chit of varying lengths. The breeding song of the species is light, sweet rapidly sung tswet-tswet-tswet-tswet. Other interaction calls include a soft sigh similar to a heavy exhale and a light tsip-tsip-tsip.

== Behavior ==
Puerto Rican tanagers are known to roost communally in large bamboo clumps or palms. They are typically the nucleus species in mixed feeding flocks, especially in the winter when neotropical migrants are present in Puerto Rico. During the breeding season, tanagers become very territorial and defend nesting territories. Puerto Rican tanagers are strong flyers, but don't often fly long distances, preferring to make short flights through the canopy or brush.

=== Feeding ===
Puerto Rican tanagers feed mainly on invertebrates and fruits. The species has been reported to occasionally consume lizards and the nestling of other birds, but most of its diet consists of spiders, insects, centipedes, snails, and various fruits. Fruit consumption is determined by season, but they often feed on fruits of the genus Cecropia and Clusia. Eleutherodactylus tree frogs, such as the common coquí, are also an important component of the Puerto Rican tanager's diet.

=== Breeding ===
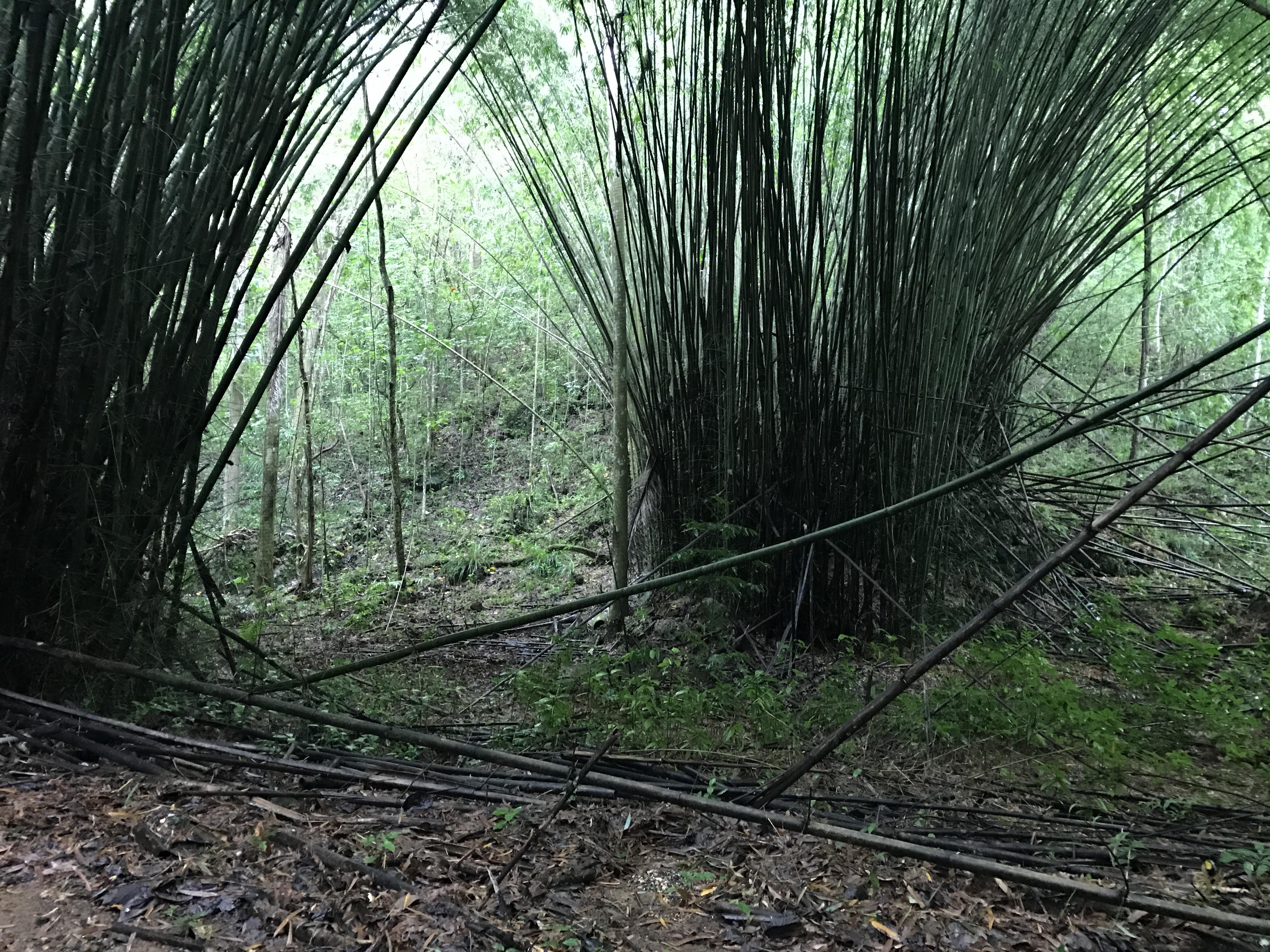
Clumps of bamboo in a Puerto Rican subtropical wet forest. Typical roosting habitat for the Puerto Rican tanager.

The breeding season lasts from January to late-July, though individuals have been recorded breeding at other times of the year. During this time the males become strongly territorial. Nests are located at the ends of branches 2–10 m (10–30 ft) off the ground and are usually cup-shaped and approximately 9.2 cm (3.6 in) across. They are typically constructed of vines, ferns, roots, and palm fibers and lined with feathers and palm leaves. Females have a clutch of two or three elliptical white eggs with reddish-brown splotches.

=== Predators ===
Communal roosting makes the species an easy target for owls on the island, such as the Puerto Rican owl. They are also a common prey item of the Puerto Rican sharp-shinned hawk.

== Distribution and habitat ==
The Puerto Rican tanager is restricted to mid- to high-elevation (300–1,350 m (1,000–4,400 ft) montane forests on the island of Puerto Rico. It typically inhabits mature and second growth montane subtropical rain and wet forests, as well as subtropical lower montane forests. Much of the population is concentrated on the eastern and western sides of the central cordillera of Puerto Rico, with populations in El Yunque National Forest and Maricao State Forest. Deforestation has contributed to fragmentation of the population, which once stretched across the entire central cordillera, but is now confined to the preserved areas and higher peaks.
