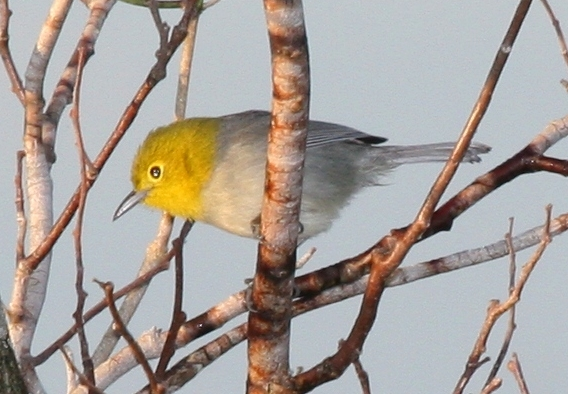
- Yellow-headed warbler (Teretistris fernandinae)

Scientific classification
- Kingdom: Animalia
- Phylum: Chordata
- Class: Aves
- Order: Passeriformes
- Superfamily: Emberizoidea
- Family: Teretistridae; Baird 1864
- Genus: Teretistris; Cabanis, 1855

Species
- See text

= Cuban warbler =

Cuban warblers

Tiny family of birds found only in Cuba

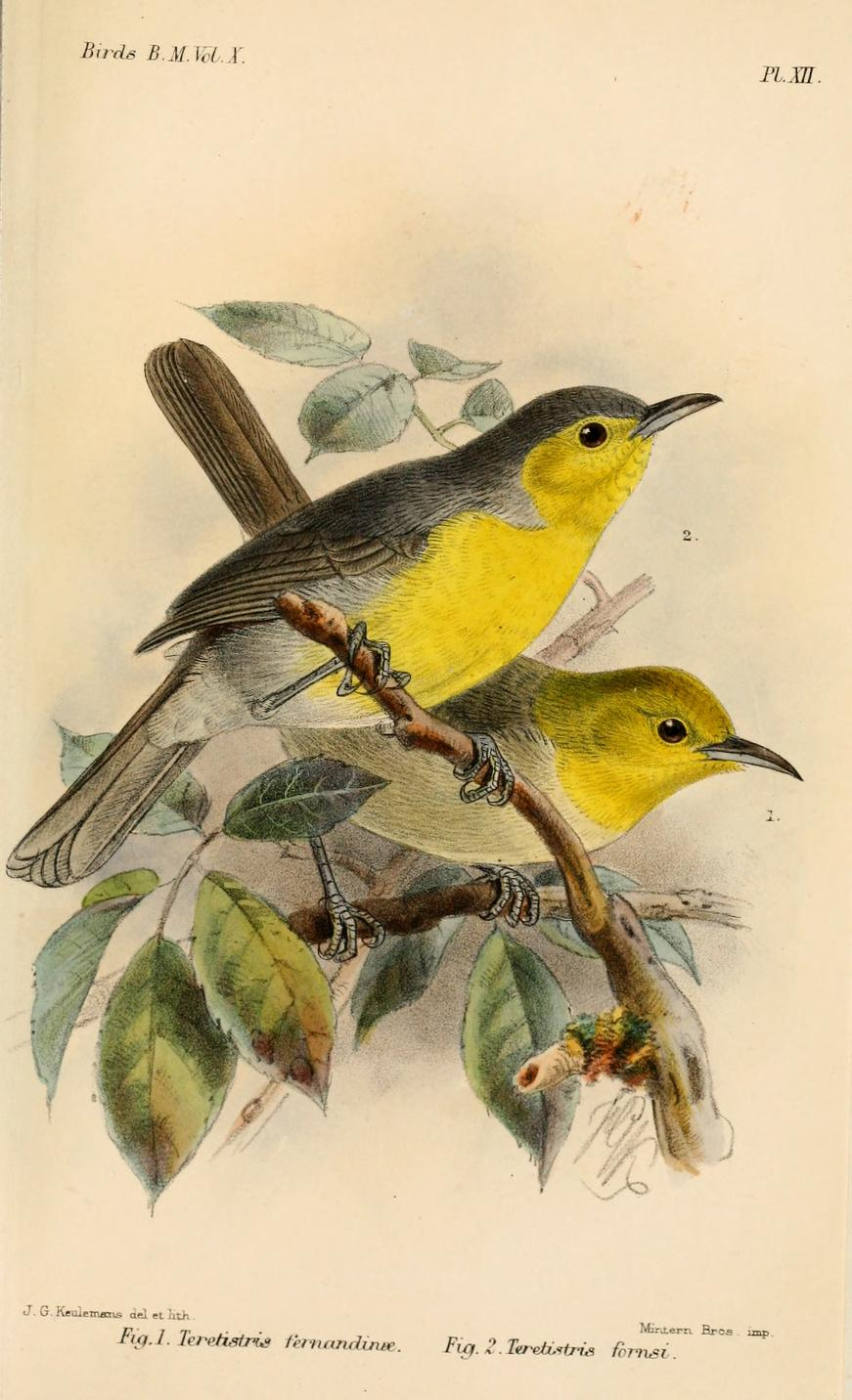
Oriente warbler (above), and yellow-headed warbler (below); illustration by Keulemans, 1885

The Cuban warblers are a genus, Teretistris, and family, Teretistridae, of birds endemic to Cuba and its surrounding cays. Until 2002 they were thought to be New World warblers, but DNA studies have shown that they are not closely related to that family. The family consists of two species, the yellow-headed warbler and the Oriente warbler. Both species are found in forest and scrub, with the yellow-headed warbler ranging in the west of the island and the Oriente warbler in the east. The Cuban warblers are 13 cm (5.1 in) long and have similar yellow and grey plumage.

The Cuban warblers are insectivores, with beetles forming a large part of the diet. Small reptiles and fruit are also taken. They feed in bushes and trees, in pairs or in small flocks during the non-breeding season, and are often the nucleus species for mixed-species feeding flocks with other birds, particularly migrants from North America.

== Taxonomy ==
The genus Teretistris was long thought to sit in the New World warbler family Parulidae, until a 2002 study examined 25 genera of New World warbler using mitochondrial and nuclear DNA found that six genera were best placed outside the family, including Teretistris. Five of the genera had long been suspected to not sit comfortably inside Parulidae, but before this study there had never been a suggestion that Teretistris did not belong in the New World warbler family.

A follow-up study published in 2013 supported the separation of the genus from Parulidae but found it difficult to resolve exactly where it sat with the other nine-primaried songbirds. Their closest relatives may be the wrenthrush of Central America (genus Zeledonia, now often treated as a monotypic family, Zeledoniidae). The study's authors nevertheless recommended separating the genus into its own family, Teretistridae. The family was included in the 58th supplement of the American Ornithological Society (AOC) checklist in 2017, and the family has also been accepted by the International Ornithological Congress' (IOC) Birds of the World: Recommended English Names, the Handbook of the Birds of the World's HBW Alive and The Clements Checklist of Birds of the World. These four authorities have also adopted the common name of Cuban warblers for the family. The 2013 Howard and Moore Complete Checklist of the Birds of the World took a different approach, however, and placed the two Cuban warblers with the wrenthrush in the family Zeledoniidae.

The family contains two closely related species, usually treated as a species pair:

Genus Teretistris – Cabanis, 1855 – two species
Common name	Scientific name and subspecies	Range	Size and ecology	IUCN status and estimated population
Yellow-headed warbler	Teretistris fernandinae (Lembeye, 1850)	western Cuba	Size: Habitat: Diet:	LC
Oriente warbler	Teretistris fornsi Gundlach, 1858	eastern Cuba	Size: Habitat: Diet:	LC

The yellow-headed warbler is monotypic, meaning it has no described subspecies. In 2000 a subspecies of the Oriente warbler, turquinensis, was described from Pico Turquino, a mountain in the south of the island. The subspecies has been accepted by some authorities, but one has suggested that further research is required.

== Distribution and habitat ==
The Cuban warblers are, as their name suggests, endemic to Cuba and its surrounding islands and cays. They have an allopatric distribution, with the yellow-headed warbler living in the west of the island and the Oriente warbler living in the east. The yellow-headed warbler is found on the northern coast of the west of the island, as well as the Zapata Peninsula, Guanahacabibes Peninsula and Isla de la Juventud to the south of Cuba. The Oriente warbler has a more discontinuous range along the northern coast of the east of the island, and a more continuous presence in the south of the island in the Oriente region. The recently described subspecies turquinensis is found in the eastern mountains of Oriente. The species is also found on the cays to the north of Cuba, but not any cays to the south. The disjunct populations are thought to be due to a lack of suitable habitat in the east. Where the two species co-occur in Matanzas Province, the Oriente warbler is found along the coast, whereas the yellow-headed warbler is found inland, suggesting niche differentiation.

Both species of Cuban warbler inhabit a range of natural forest with good understory and drier scrubbier habitat, from sea-level up into the mountains of Cuba. The Oriente warbler is more likely to live in scrub nearer the coasts, and humid forests higher in hills and mountains.

== Description ==
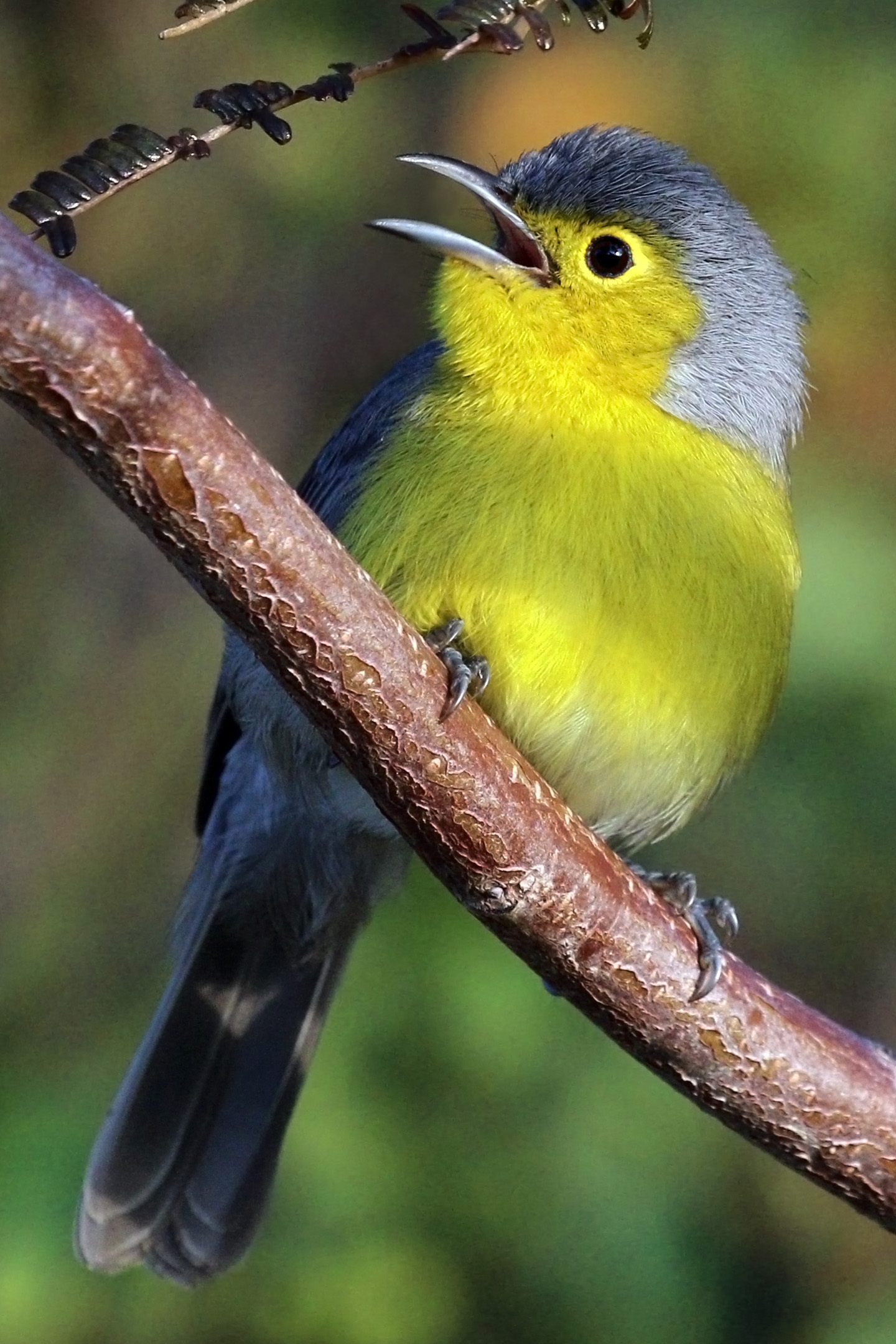
The forehead and crown of the Oriente warbler is grey, as opposed to the entirely yellow head of the yellow-headed warbler.

The Cuban warblers are around 13 cm (5.1 in) long and weigh between 6–18 g (0.21–0.63 oz). Both are similar in appearance to New World warblers, and have similar plumage to each other. They have grey backs, wings and tails, and yellow faces and throats; the Oriente warbler has a grey crown and forehead and yellow down to the upper belly, with a white lower belly and rear, and the yellow-headed had an entirely yellow head but a grey breast, belly and rear. Both species have a yellow eye-ring. The sexes are almost identical, but females have slightly shorter tails. The bills are robust and slightly curved, and blackish-grey to grey.

== Behaviour ==
=== Diet and feeding ===
Insects form a large part of the diet of the Cuban warblers. Stomach-content analysis of the Oriente warbler showed that beetles formed a large part of its diet, with a smaller part of its diet being composed of true bugs (Hemiptera) and moths and butterflies. Both species are also reported to take small lizards; the Oriente warbler has also been reported eating small fruit. The yellow-headed warbler typically feeds in the understorey and mid canopy parts of the forest, a form of niche partitioning with the olive-capped warbler which more usually forages in the higher canopy, whereas the Oriente warbler feeds at higher levels in the canopy, above 5 m (16 ft) in the morning, before moving to feed closer to the ground in the evening. It has been suggested that this shift may relate to the changes in temperature over the day; as the day heats up foraging birds move lower where it may be cooler.

The Cuban warblers are often found in flocks of up to six birds in the non-breeding season. These small flocks often serve as the nucleus of mixed-species feeding flocks of native species and in particular overwintering migrants from North America. The yellow-headed warbler was found in 82% of mixed species flocks observed in its range, and the Orinete warbler in 42% of its potential flocks (although the sample size was much smaller).

=== Breeding ===
The nesting biology of the Cuban warblers has not been documented in detail. Both species are seasonal breeders, with a nesting season ranging from March to July and an egg-laying period from March to May. The nest of the Oriente warbler is a simple unlined cup constructed of small vines, roots, moss and feathers. The cup measures 40 to 55 mm (1.6–2.2 in) in diameter, and is 35 mm (1.4 in) high with a depth of 23 mm (0.91 in). The nests are usually placed within 1 m (3.3 ft) on a branch usually concealed among epiphytes such as Tillandsia moss or parasitic plants. The nest of the yellow-headed warbler is also a cup, made of similar materials and grass, placed close to the ground in low vegetation.
