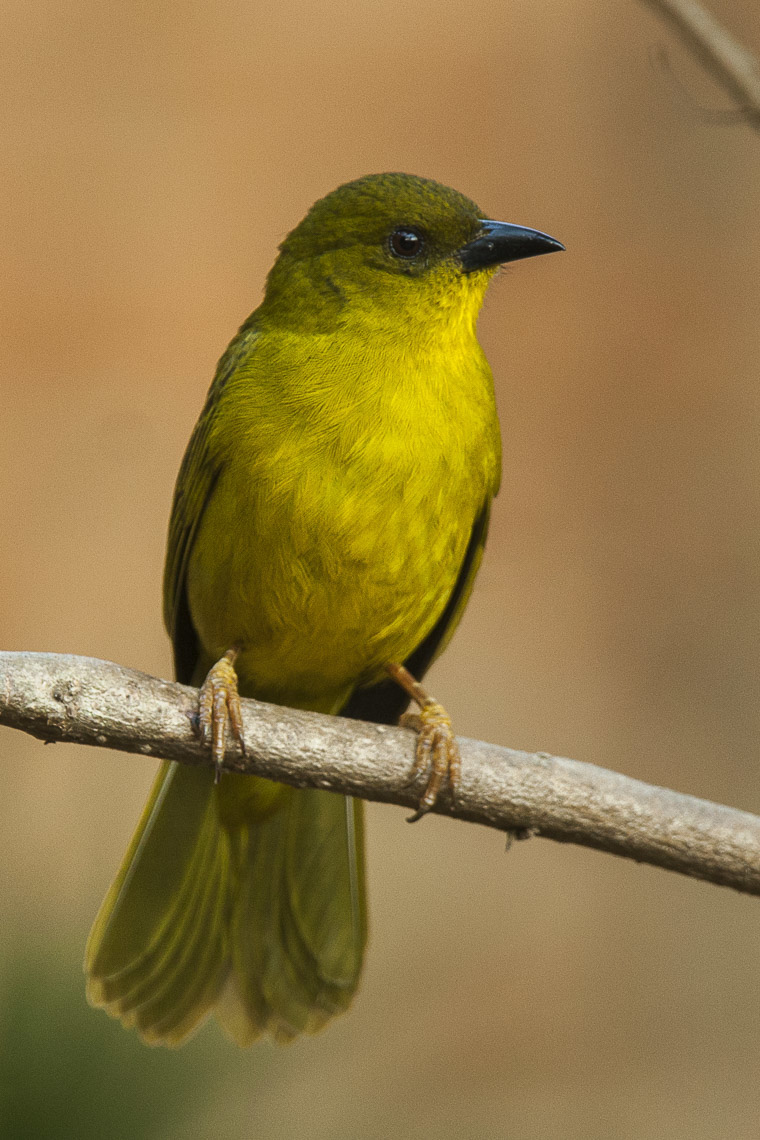
- Olive-green tanager

Scientific classification
- Kingdom: Animalia
- Phylum: Chordata
- Class: Aves
- Order: Passeriformes
- Superfamily: Emberizoidea
- Family: Mitrospingidae; Barker et al., 2013

Genera
- see text.

= Mitrospingidae =

Family of birds

The Mitrospingidae is a family of passerine birds. It consists of three genera and four species. The family is found in South America and southern Central America. The family was identified in 2013, and consists of birds that have been traditionally placed in the family Thraupidae. The family was adopted by the American Ornithological Society in their 58th supplement of their checklist in 2017 and in the online list of birds maintained by Frank Gill, Pamela Rasmussen, and David Donsker on behalf of the International Ornithological Committee (IOC).

== Genera ==
Image	Genus	Living species
	Mitrospingus Ridgway, 1898	Dusky-faced tanager, M. cassinii; Olive-backed tanager, M. oleagineus
	Orthogonys Strickland, 1844	Olive-green tanager, O. chloricterus
	Lamprospiza Cabanis, 1847	Red-billed pied tanager, L. melanoleuca
