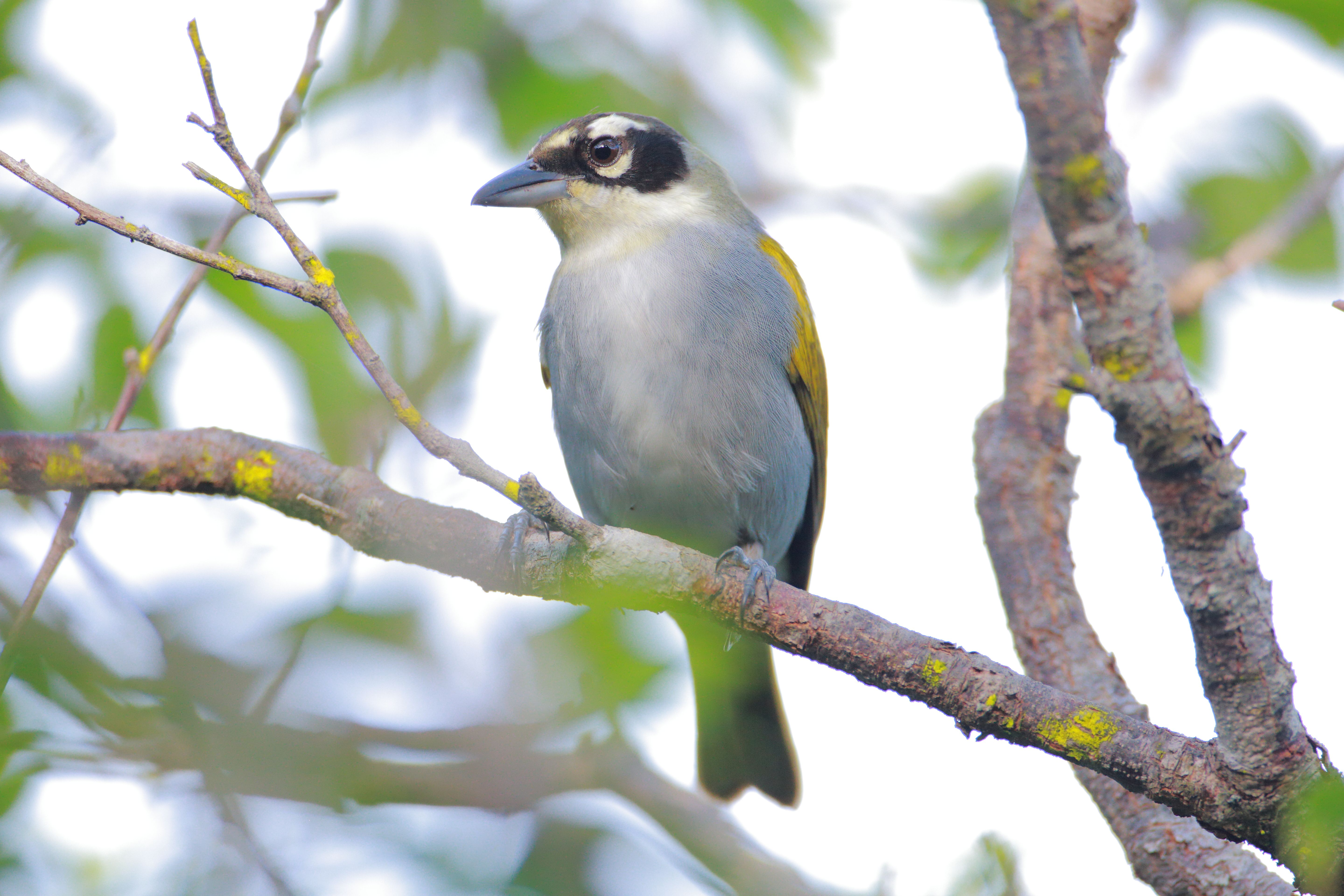
- Black-crowned tanager (Phaenicophilus palmarum)

Scientific classification
- Kingdom: Animalia
- Phylum: Chordata
- Class: Aves
- Order: Passeriformes
- Superfamily: Emberizoidea
- Family: Phaenicophilidae; P.L. Sclater, 1886

Type genus
- Phaenicophilus Strickland, 1851

Subfamilies and genera
- Phaenicophilinae; Xenoligea; Microligea; Phaenicophilus; Spindalinae; Nesospingus; Spindalis

= Phaenicophilidae =

Family of birds

Phaenicophilidae are a family of passerine birds mostly endemic to the West Indies. They are collectively called the Greater Antillean tanagers. The family contains nine species in five genera. These species were historically classified within the families Thraupidae (tanagers) and Parulidae (New World warblers), but genetic studies have confirmed they form a distinct clade.

== Taxonomy ==
The family was originally established to classify the genus Phaenicophilus. It was reinstated when molecular genetic studies revealed that various species traditionally classified in Thraupidae (including the two Phaenicophilus species) and some from Parulidae were not as closely related to the members of those families as they were to each other. This led to the inclusion of the genera Microligea and Xenoligea into Phaenicophilidae. Most recently, several other groups of Caribbean tanagers—specifically the genera Nesospingus and Spindalis—which had been tentatively associated with this group have been added to the family. Analyses by Barker et al. (2013, 2015) had suggested these latter two lineages were sufficiently divergent to warrant their own monotypic families: Nesospingidae and Spindalidae, respectively. These taxa are likely closely related to one another but appear to have diverged in the distant past. The merging of the members of the Nesospingidae and Spindalidae families into an enlarged Phaenicophilidae family has been adopted by the Clements Checklist and the International Ornithological Congress (IOC) in 2025. This treatment was also adopted by AviList in 2026.

The closest relatives to this family is the wrenthrush.

== Species ==
The family consists of two subfamilies, five genera and nine species:

=== Phaenicophilinae ===
Image	Genus	Species
	Xenoligea; Bond, 1967	White-winged warbler (Xenoligea montana)
	Microligea; Cory, 1884	Green-tailed warbler (Microligea palustris)
	Phaenicophilus; Strickland, 1851	Black-crowned palm-tanager (Phaenicophilus palmarum); Grey-crowned palm-tanager (Phaenicophilus poliocephalus)

=== Spindalinae ===
Image	Genus	Species
	Nesospingus; Sclater, 1885	Puerto Rican tanager (Nesospingus speculiferus)
	Spindalis; Jardine & Selby, 1837	Western spindalis (Spindalis zena); Jamaican spindalis (Spindalis nigricephala); Hispaniolan spindalis (Spindalis dominicensis); Puerto Rican spindalis (Spindalis portoricensis)
