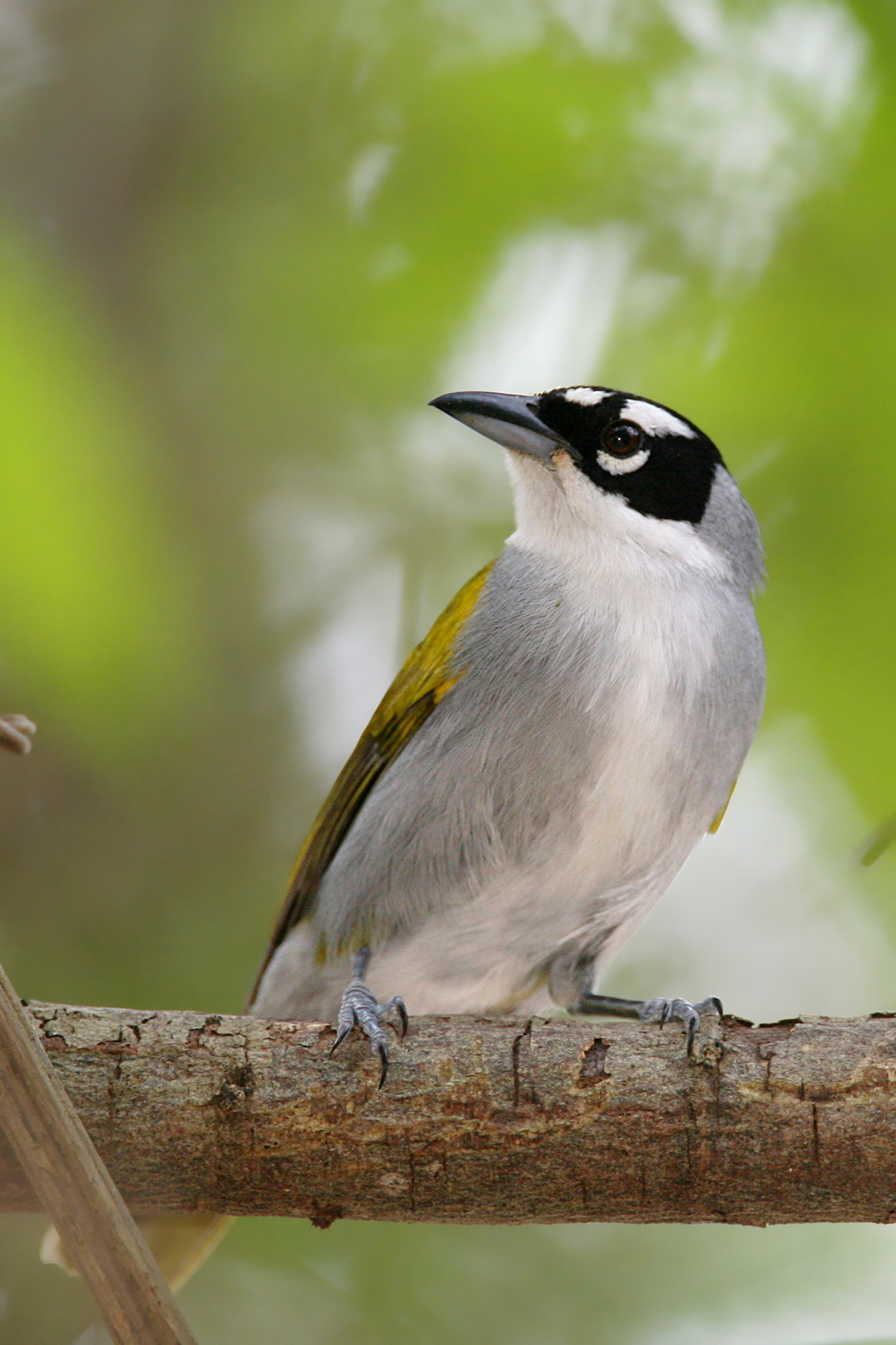
- Black-crowned tanager (Phaenicophilus palmarum)

Scientific classification
- Kingdom: Animalia
- Phylum: Chordata
- Class: Aves
- Order: Passeriformes
- Family: Phaenicophilidae
- Subfamily: Phaenicophilinae
- Genus: Phaenicophilus; Strickland, 1851

Type species
- Turdus palmarum Linnaeus, 1766

= Phaenicophilus =

Genus of birds

Phaenicophilus is a genus of birds that was formerly placed in the family Thraupidae, but is now placed in the Greater Antillean tanager family Phaenicophilidae. Its members are known as palm-tanagers.

The genus Phaenicophilus was introduced by the English geologist and naturalist Hugh Edwin Strickland in 1851. The type species was subsequently designated as the black-crowned palm-tanager.

The genus contains the following two species:

Genus Phaenicophilus – Strickland, 1851 – two species
Common name	Scientific name and subspecies	Range	Size and ecology	IUCN status and estimated population
Black-crowned palm-tanager	Phaenicophilus palmarum (Linnaeus, 1766)	Throughout the mainland Dominican Republic (including Saona Island) and Haiti (except the Tiburon Peninsula)	Size: 17–18 cm (6.7–7.1 in); 24–32 g (0.85–1.1 oz) Habitat: Almost every landscape on Hispaniola: many forest types from dry to humid and open to dense, plus rural and urban gardens and parks; sea level to about 2,500 m (8,200 ft), most common well below 2,000 m (6,600 ft) Diet: Forages in pairs or family groups at all levels of the forest, sometimes joining mixed-species flocks; diet about two-thirds insects and one-third fruit, with a small amount of nectar	LC Stable; population size unknown
Grey-crowned palm-tanager	Phaenicophilus poliocephalus (Bonaparte, 1851) Three subspecies: P. p. poliocephalus (Bonaparte, 1851): Tiburon Peninsula of southwestern Haiti and Grande Cayemite; rarely in the Dominican Republic; P. p. coryi: Gonâve Island; P. p. tetraopes: Île-à-Vache	Tiburon Peninsula of southwestern Haiti and Grande Cayemite, Île-à-Vache and Gonâve Island; in the Dominican Republic rarely on the north and south slopes of the Sierra de Baoruco, southern Loma de Toro and Hoyo de Pelempito	Size: About 18 cm (7.1 in); about 27 g (0.95 oz) Habitat: Every available forest type from dry to wet and open to dense, plus tree plantations and rural and urban gardens and parks; sea level to 2,400 m (7,900 ft) Diet: Forages in pairs or family groups from the forest mid-level to the canopy, sometimes joining mixed-species flocks; mainly small arthropods, gleaned from living and dead foliage, with a lesser amount of fruit	NT Decreasing; population size unknown
