= List of birds of Cuba =

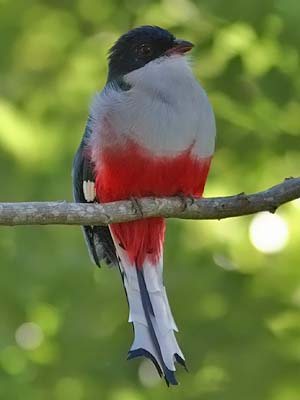
The Cuban trogon is the national bird of Cuba.

This is a list of birds species recorded in the archipelago of Cuba, which consists of the main island of Cuba and over 1000 smaller cays and islands. The confirmed avifauna of Cuba included a total of 407 species as of May 2023 according to the Annotated Checklist of the Birds of Cuba. Of them, 25 are endemic, 15 have been introduced by humans, and 151 are noted as rare. Thirty-two endemic subspecies of more widespread species are noted. Two species are known to be extinct and two others possibly are. An additional 13 species are classed as hypothetical. Fifteen species are globally threatened.

This list is presented in the taxonomic sequence of the Check-list of North and Middle American Birds, 7th edition through the 63rd Supplement, published by the American Ornithological Society (AOS). Common and scientific names are also those of the Check-list, except that the common names of families are from the Clements taxonomy because the AOS list does not include them. Additional accidental species have been added from different sources.

The following tags have been used to highlight several categories of occurrence.

- (R) Rare - A species that has occurred fewer than twice per year according to Navarro; includes Navarro's "Rare", "Very Rare", and "Exceptionally Rare" categories.
- (E) Endemic - a species endemic to the archipelago of Cuba.
- (I) Introduced - a species introduced to the archipelago of Cuba as a consequence, direct or indirect, of human actions

== Ducks, geese, and waterfowl ==
Order: Anseriformes Family: Anatidae

Anatidae includes the ducks and most duck-like waterfowl, such as geese and swans. These birds are adapted to an aquatic existence with webbed feet, flattened bills, and feathers that are excellent at shedding water due to an oily coating.

Common name	Binomial	Status
White-faced whistling-duck	Dendrocygna viduata	(R)
Black-bellied whistling-duck	Dendrocygna autumnalis	
West Indian whistling-duck	Dendrocygna arborea	vulnerable
Fulvous whistling-duck	Dendrocygna bicolor	
Snow goose	Anser caerulescens	
Greater white-fronted goose	Anser albifrons	(R)
Brant	Branta bernicla	(R)
Canada goose	Branta canadensis	
Tundra swan	Cygnus columbianus	(R)
Muscovy duck	Cairina moschata	(I)
Wood duck	Aix sponsa	
Blue-winged teal	Spatula discors	
Cinnamon teal	Spatula cyanoptera	(R)
Northern shoveler	Spatula clypeata	
Gadwall	Mareca strepera	
Eurasian wigeon	Mareca penelope	(R)
American wigeon	Mareca americana	
Mallard	Anas platyrhynchos	
American black duck	Anas rubripes	(H)
White-cheeked pintail	Anas bahamensis	
Northern pintail	Anas acuta	
Green-winged teal	Anas crecca	
Canvasback	Aythya valisineria	
Redhead	Aythya americana	
Ring-necked duck	Aythya collaris	
Greater scaup	Aythya marila	(H)
Lesser scaup	Aythya affinis	
Surf scoter	Melanitta perspicillata	(R)
White-winged scoter	Melanitta deglandi	(R)
Bufflehead	Bucephala albeola	(R)
Common goldeneye	Bucephala clangula	(H)
Hooded merganser	Lophodytes cucullatus	(R)
Common merganser	Mergus merganser	(R)
Red-breasted merganser	Mergus serrator	
Masked duck	Nomonyx dominicus	
Ruddy duck	Oxyura jamaicensis	

== Guineafowl ==
Order: Galliformes Family: Numididae

Guineafowls are a group of African, seed-eating, ground-nesting birds that resemble partridges, but with featherless heads and spangled gray plumage.

Common name	Binomial	Status
Helmeted guineafowl	Numida meleagris	(I)

== New World quail ==
Order: Galliformes Family: Odontophoridae

The New World quails are small, plump terrestrial birds only distantly related to the quails of the Old World, but named for their similar appearance and habits.

Common name	Binomial	Status
Northern bobwhite	Colinus virginianus cubanensis	(Es) near-threatened

== Pheasants, grouse, and allies ==
Order: Galliformes Family: Phasianidae

The Phasianidae are a family of terrestrial birds which consists of quails, partridges, snowcocks, francolins, spurfowls, tragopans, monals, pheasants, peafowls, and jungle fowls. In general, they are plump (although they vary in size) and have broad, relatively short wings.

Common name	Binomial	Status
Ring-necked pheasant	Phasianus colchicus	(I)

== Flamingos ==
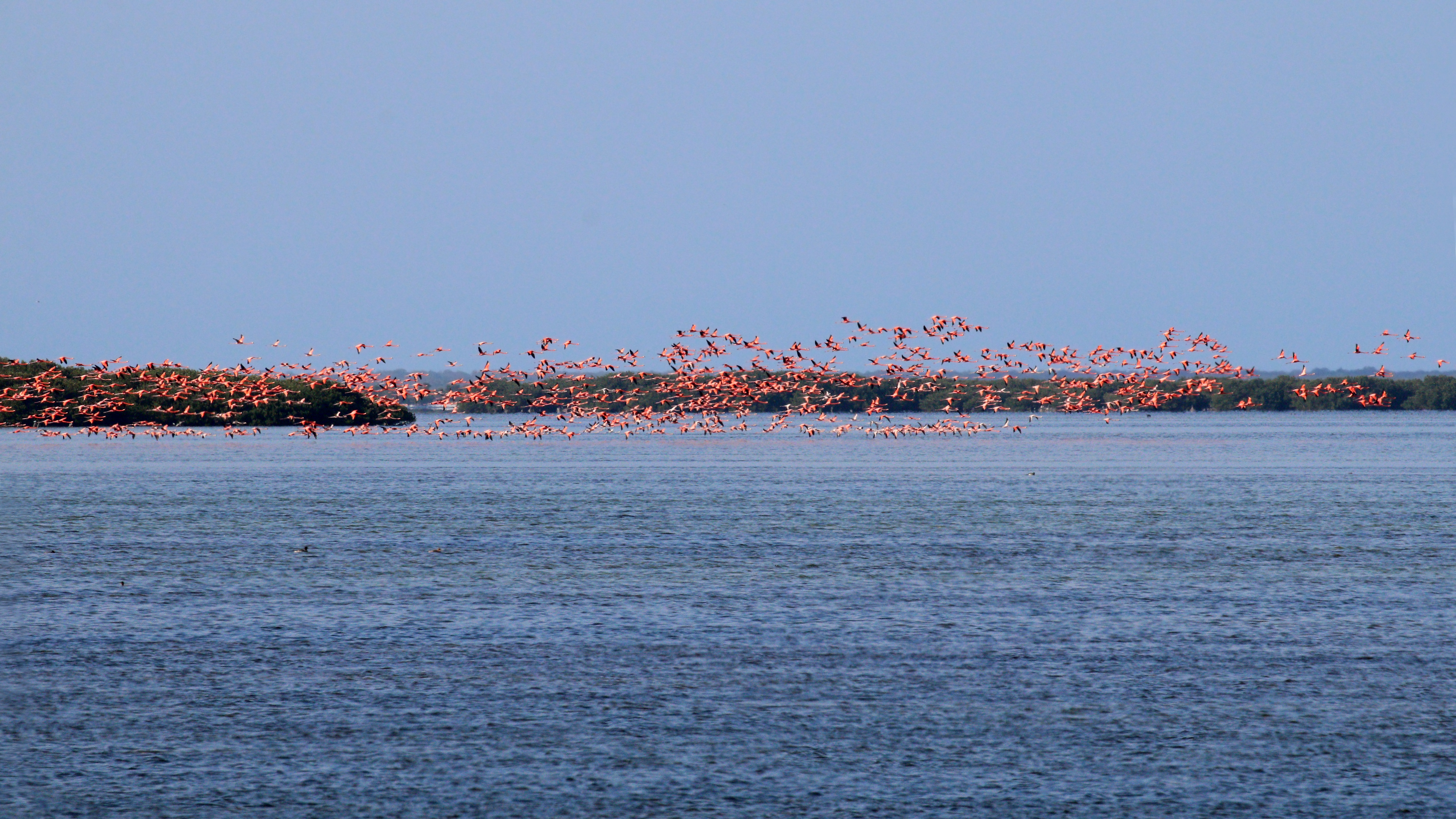
American flamingos

Order: Phoenicopteriformes Family: Phoenicopteridae

Flamingos are gregarious wading birds, usually 3 to 5 feet (0.9 to 1.5 m) tall, found in both the Western and Eastern Hemispheres. Flamingos filter-feed on shellfish and algae. Their oddly shaped beaks are specially adapted to separate mud and silt from the food they consume and, uniquely, are used upside down.

Common name	Binomial	Status
American flamingo	Phoenicopterus ruber	

== Grebes ==
Order: Podicipediformes Family: Podicipedidae

Grebes are small to medium-large freshwater diving birds. They have lobed toes and are excellent swimmers and divers. However, they have their feet placed far back on the body, making them quite ungainly on land.

Common name	Binomial	Status
Least grebe	Tachybaptus dominicus	
Pied-billed grebe	Podilymbus podiceps	

== Pigeons and doves ==
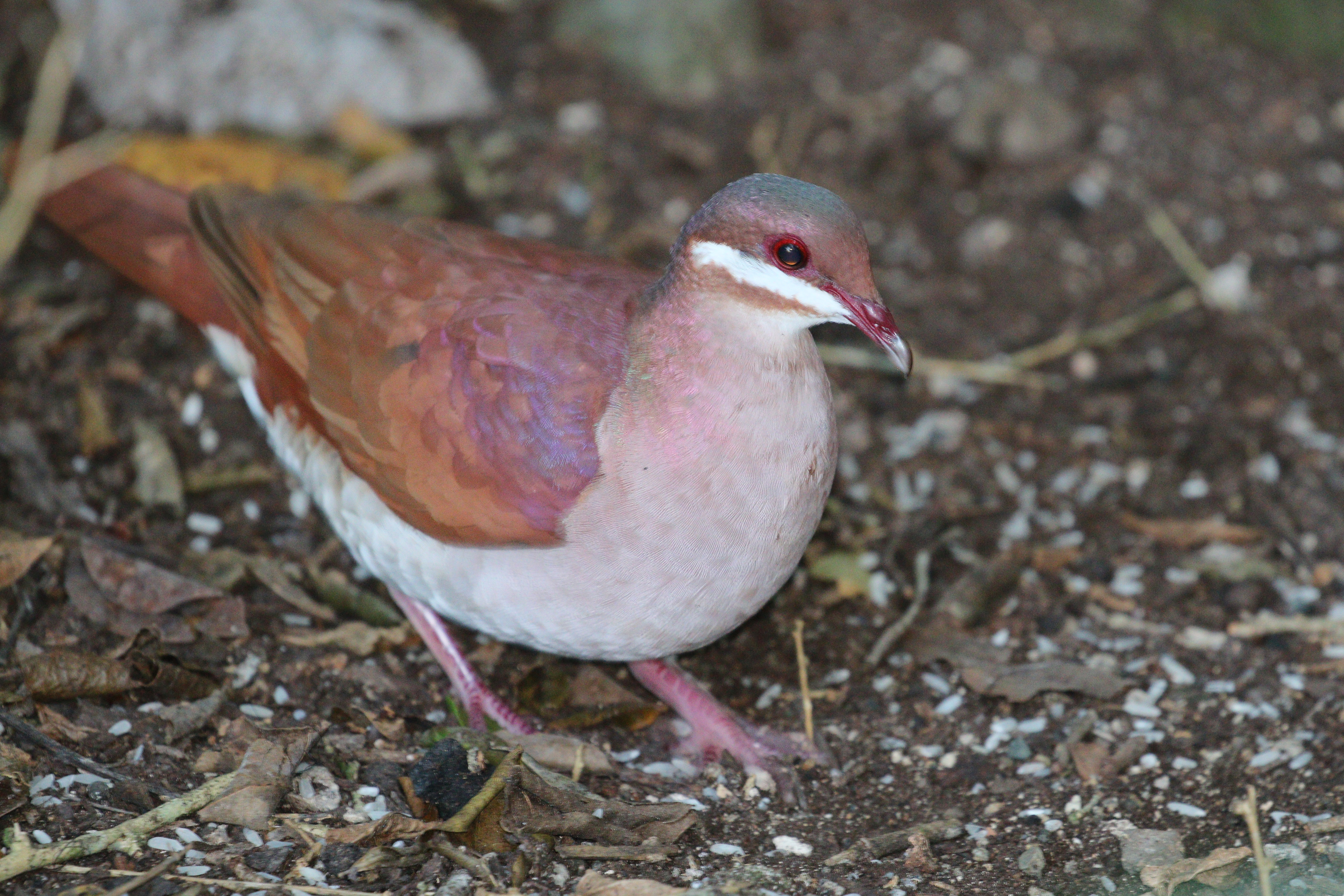
Key West quail-dove

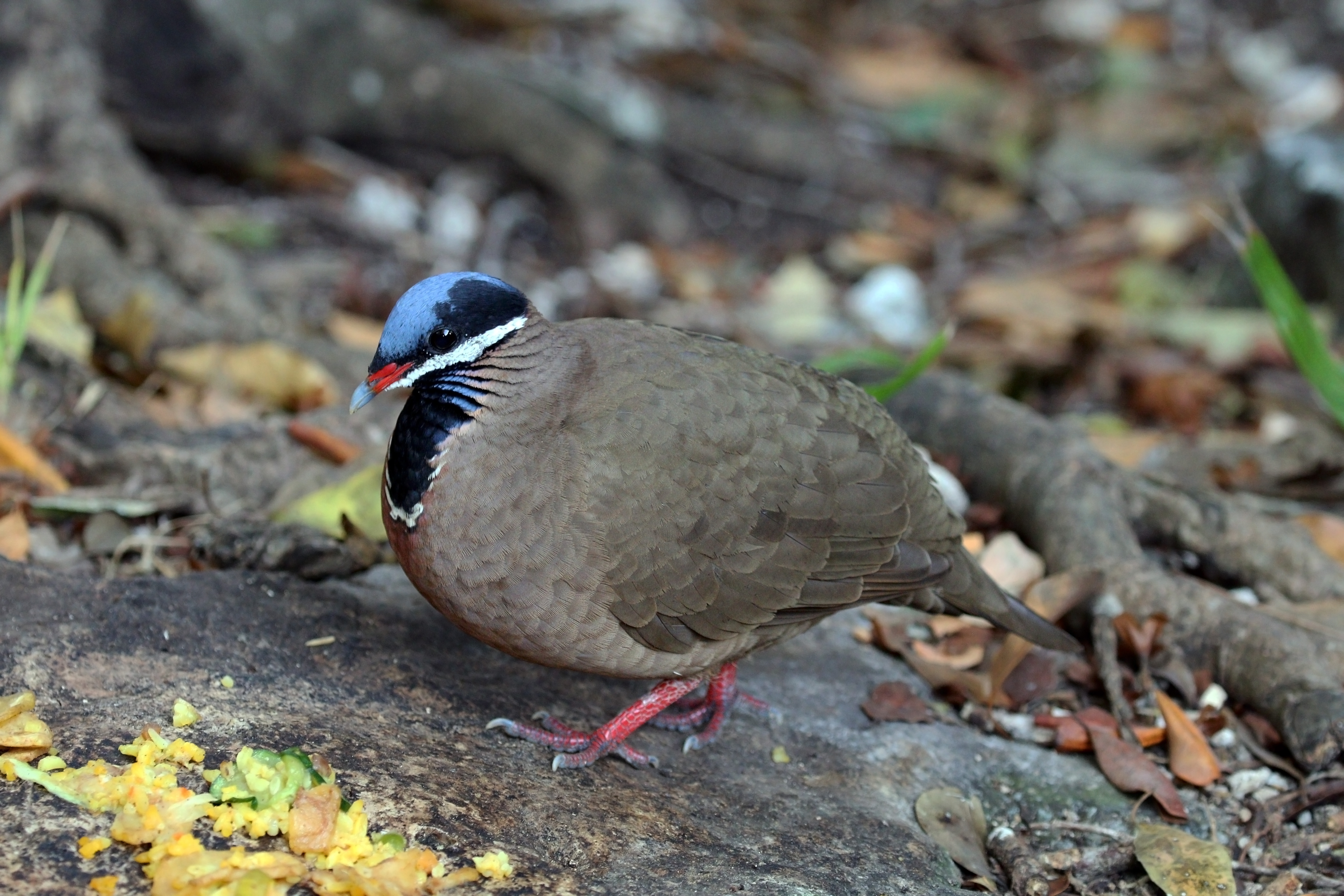
Blue-headed quail-dove

Order: Columbiformes Family: Columbidae

Pigeons and doves are stout-bodied birds with short necks and short slender bills with a fleshy cere.

Common name	Binomial	Status
Rock pigeon	Columba livia	(I)
Scaly-naped pigeon	Patagioenas squamosa	
White-crowned pigeon	Patagioenas leucocephala	near-threatened
Plain pigeon	Patagioenas inornata	near-threatened
Eurasian collared-dove	Streptopelia decaocto	(I)
Passenger pigeon	Ectopistes migratorius	extinct
Common ground dove	Columbina passerina	
Blue-headed quail-dove	Starnoenas cyanocephala	(E) endangered
Ruddy quail-dove	Geotrygon montana	
Gray-fronted quail-dove	Geotrygon caniceps	(E) vulnerable
Key West quail-dove	Geotrygon chrysia	
White-winged dove	Zenaida asiatica	
Zenaida dove	Zenaida aurita	
Mourning dove	Zenaida macroura	

== Cuckoos ==
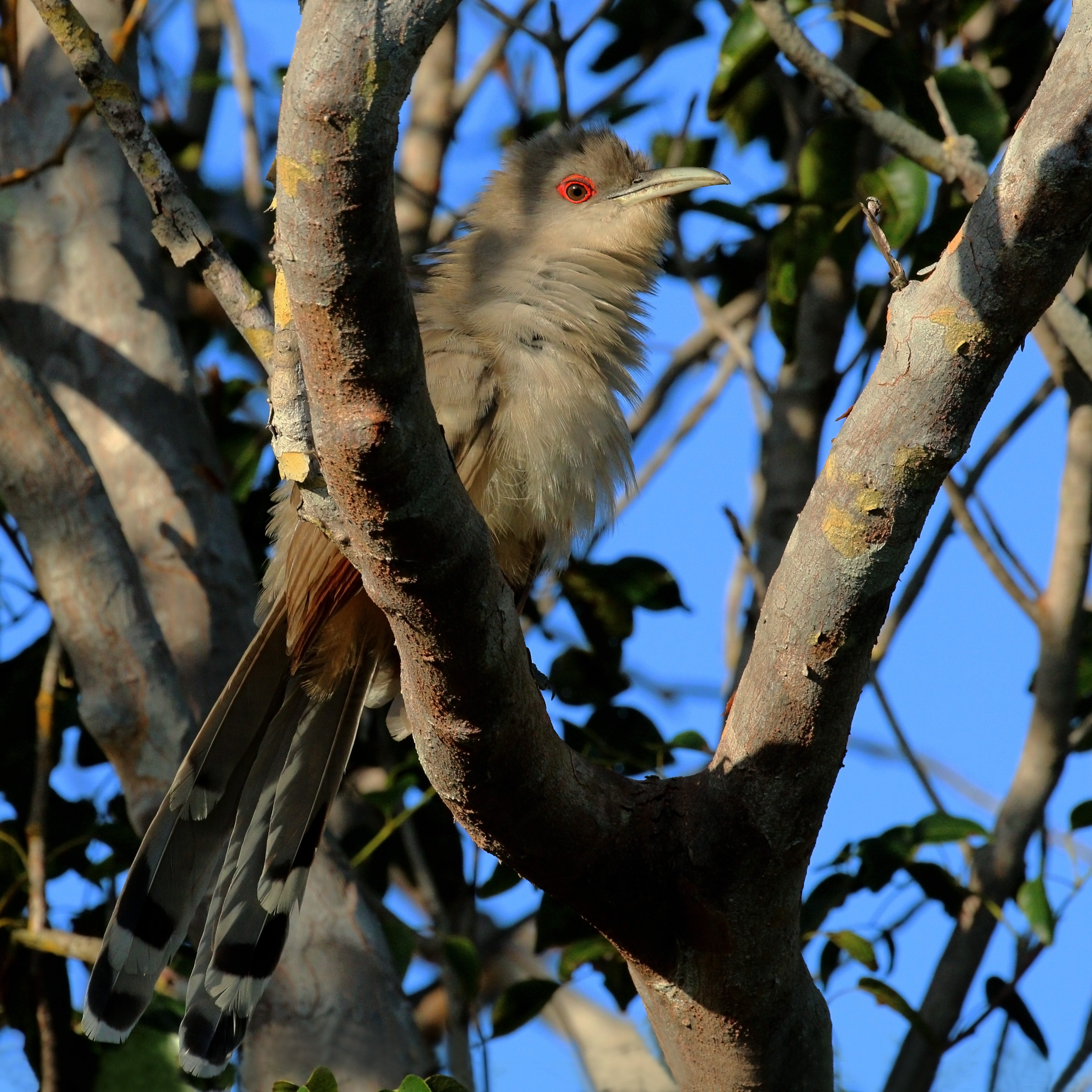
Great lizard-cuckoo

Order: Cuculiformes Family: Cuculidae

The family Cuculidae includes cuckoos, roadrunners, and anis. These birds are of variable size with slender bodies, long tails, and strong legs. The Old World cuckoos are brood parasites.

Common name	Binomial	Status
Smooth-billed ani	Crotophaga ani	
Yellow-billed cuckoo	Coccyzus americanus	
Mangrove cuckoo	Coccyzus minor	
Black-billed cuckoo	Coccyzus erythropthalmus	(R)
Great lizard-cuckoo	Coccyzus merlini	

== Nightjars and allies ==
Order: Caprimulgiformes Family: Caprimulgidae

Nightjars are medium-sized nocturnal birds that usually nest on the ground. They have long wings, short legs, and very short bills. Most have small feet, of little use for walking, and long pointed wings. Their soft plumage is camouflaged to resemble bark or leaves.

Common name	Binomial	Status
Common nighthawk	Chordeiles minor	
Antillean nighthawk	Chordeiles gundlachii	
Chuck-will's-widow	Antrostomus carolinensis	
Greater Antillean nightjar	Antrostomus cubanensis	The two subspecies in Cuba are considered a separate species, Cuban nightjar, by Navarro
Eastern whip-poor-will	Antrostomus vociferus	(R)

== Potoos ==
Order: Nyctibiiformes Family: Nyctibiidae

The potoos (sometimes called poor-me-ones) are large near passerine birds related to the nightjars and frogmouths. They are nocturnal insectivores which lack the bristles around the mouth found in the true nightjars.

Common name	Binomial	Status
Northern potoo	Nyctibius jamaicensis	

== Swifts ==
Order: Apodiformes Family: Apodidae

Swifts are small birds which spend the majority of their lives flying. These birds have very short legs and never settle voluntarily on the ground, perching instead only on vertical surfaces. Many swifts have long swept-back wings which resemble a crescent or boomerang.

Common name	Binomial	Status
Black swift	Cypseloides niger	
White-collared swift	Streptoprocne zonaris	
Chimney swift	Chaetura pelagica	(R) near-threatened
Antillean palm-swift	Tachornis phoenicobia iradii	(Es)

== Hummingbirds ==
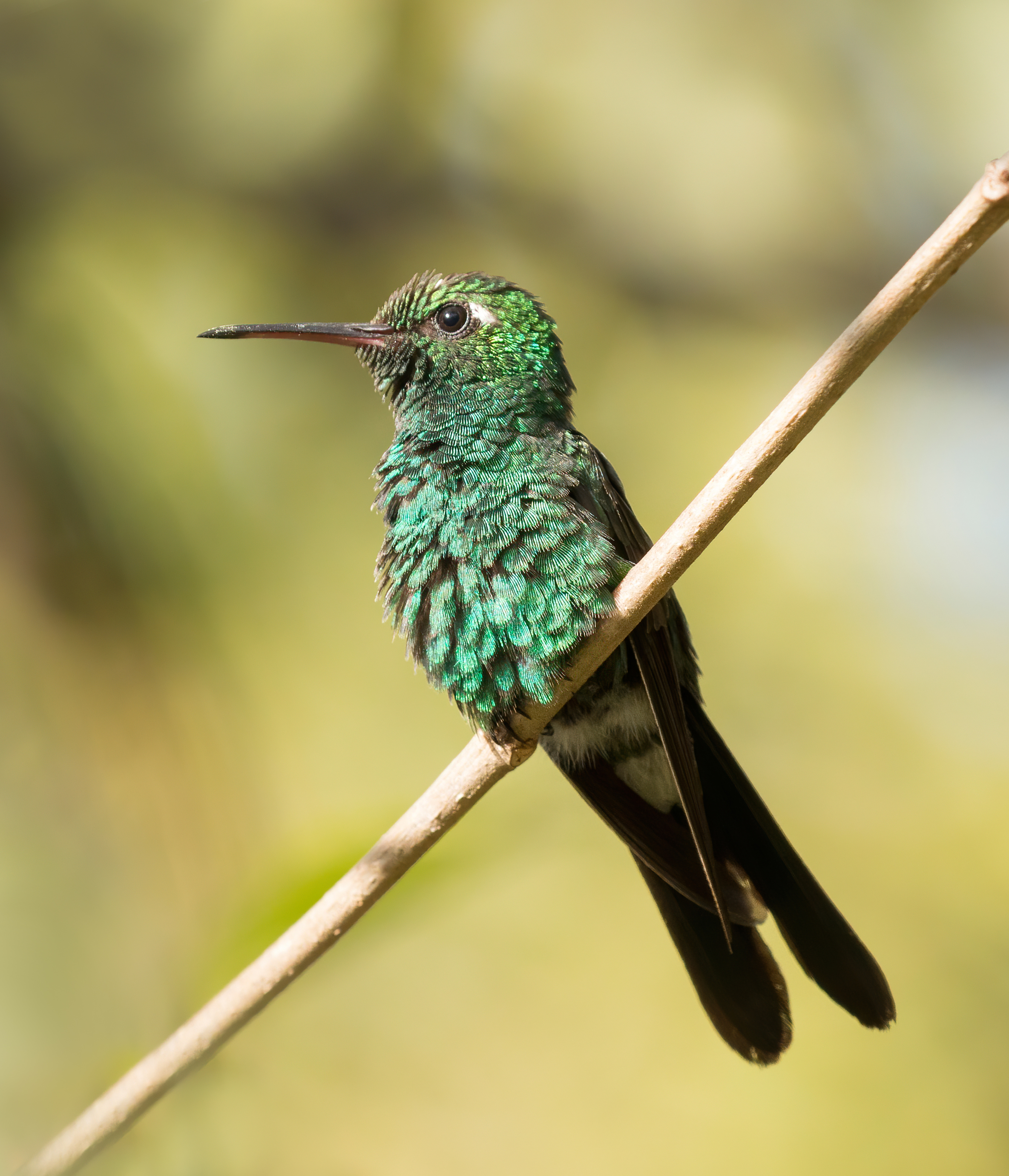
Cuban emerald

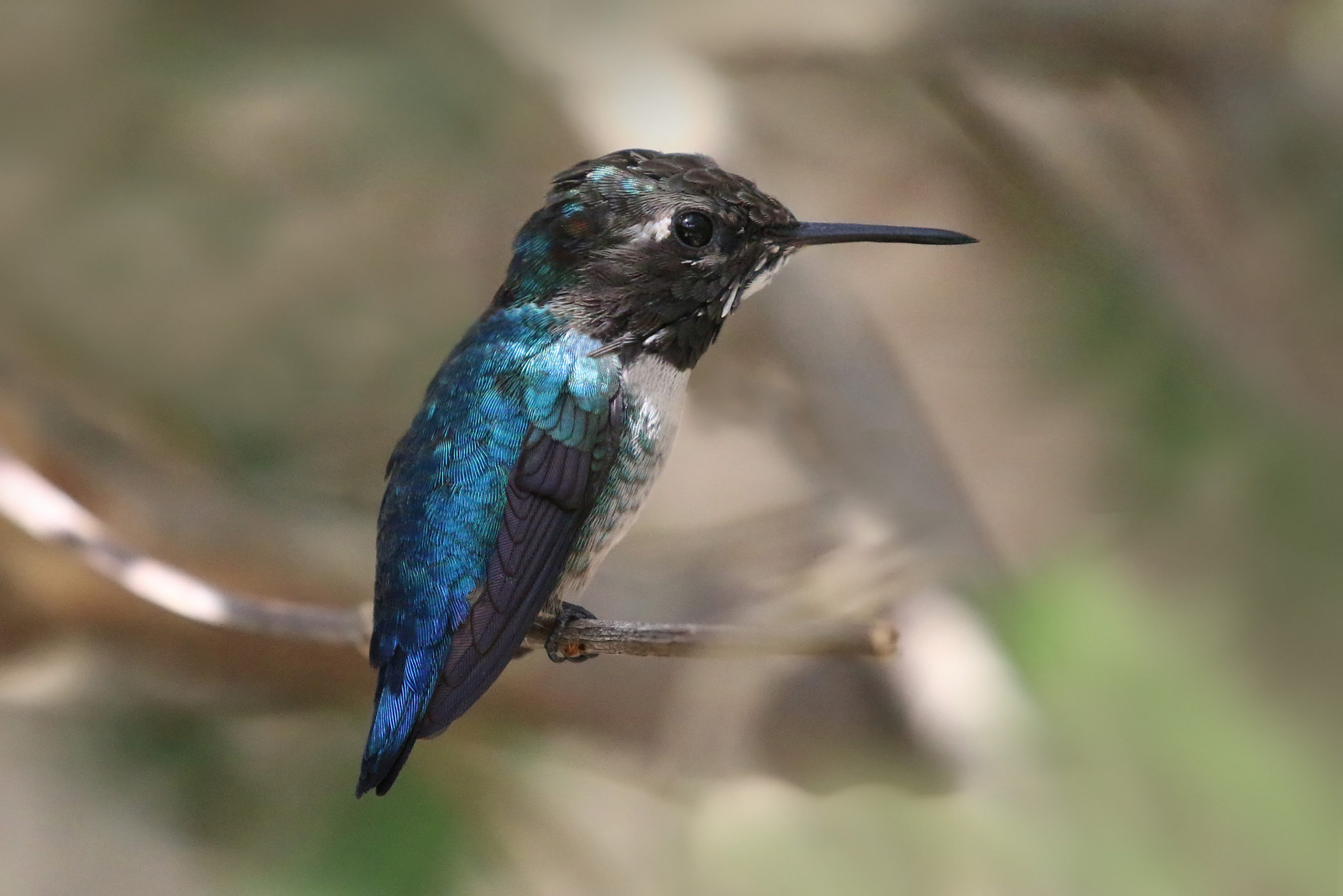
Bee hummingbird

Order: Apodiformes Family: Trochilidae

Hummingbirds are small birds capable of hovering in mid-air due to the rapid flapping of their wings. They are the only birds that can fly backwards.

Common name	Binomial	Status
Ruby-throated hummingbird	Archilochus colubris	
Bee hummingbird	Mellisuga helenae	(E) near-threatened
Bahama woodstar	Nesophlox evelynae	(R)
Cuban emerald	Riccordia ricordii ricordii	(Es)

== Rails, gallinules, and coots ==
Order: Gruiformes Family: Rallidae

Rallidae is a large family of small to medium-sized birds which includes the rails, crakes, coots, and gallinules. Typically they inhabit dense vegetation in damp environments near lakes, swamps, or rivers. In general they are shy and secretive birds, making them difficult to observe. Most species have strong legs and long toes which are well adapted to soft uneven surfaces. They tend to have short, rounded wings and to be weak fliers.

Common name	Binomial	Status
Zapata rail	Cyanolimnas cerverai	(E) Critically endangered
Spotted rail	Pardirallus maculatus	
King rail	Rallus elegans ramsdeni	(Es) Near-threatened
Clapper rail	Rallus crepitans	
Virginia rail	Rallus limicola	(R)
Sora	Porzana carolina	
Common gallinule	Gallinula galeata	
American coot	Fulica americana	
Purple gallinule	Porphyrio martinica	
Yellow-breasted crake	Haplocrex flaviventer	
Black rail	Laterallus jamaicensis	(R) Near-threatened

== Limpkin ==
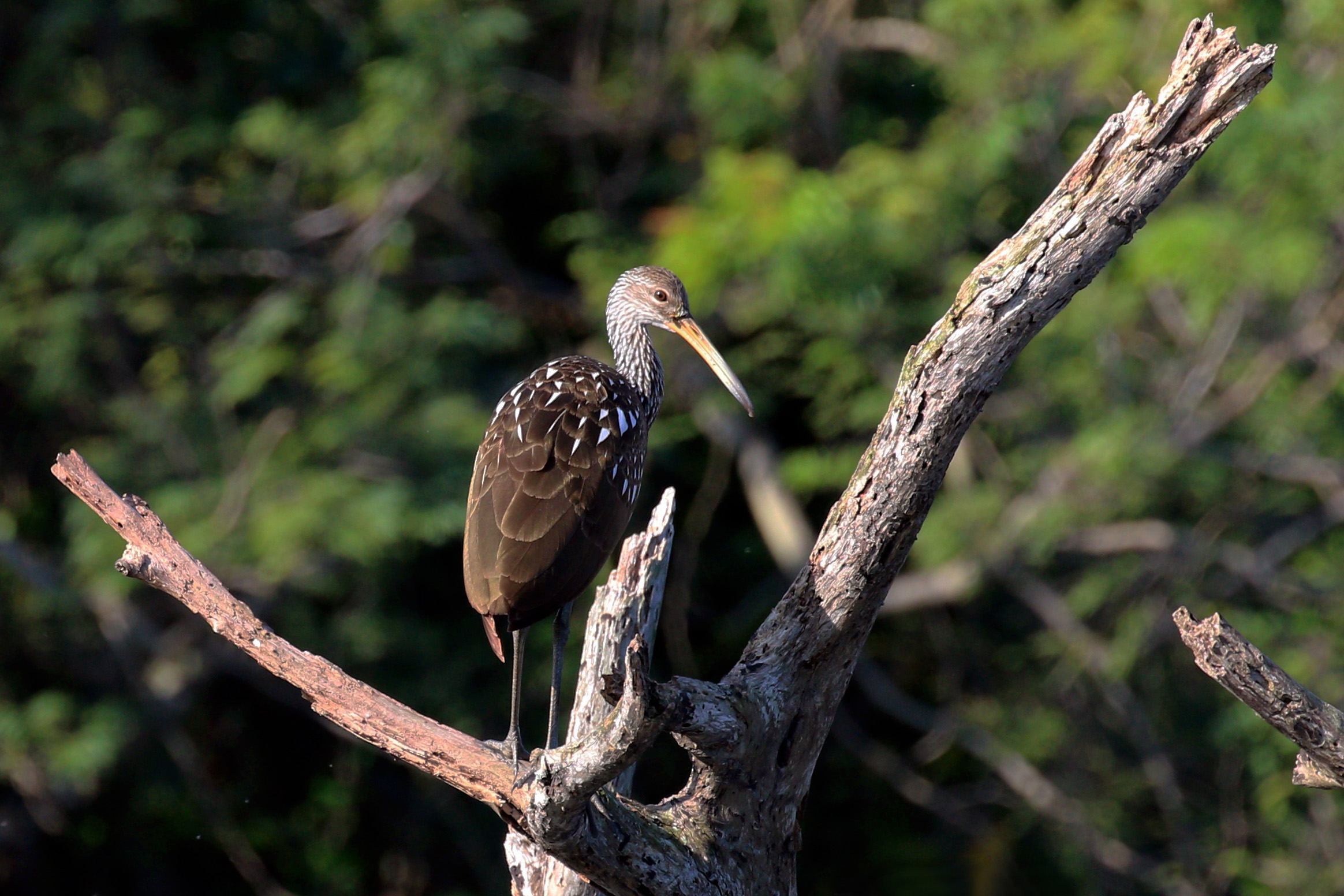
Limpkin

Order: Gruiformes Family: Aramidae

The limpkin resembles a large rail. It has drab-brown plumage and a grayer head and neck.

Common name	Binomial	Status
Limpkin	Aramus guarauna	

== Cranes ==
Order: Gruiformes Family: Gruidae

Cranes are large, long-legged, and long-necked birds. Unlike the similar-looking but unrelated herons, cranes fly with necks outstretched rather than retracted.

Common name	Binomial	Status
Sandhill crane	Antigone canadensis nesiotes	(Es)

== Stilts and avocets ==
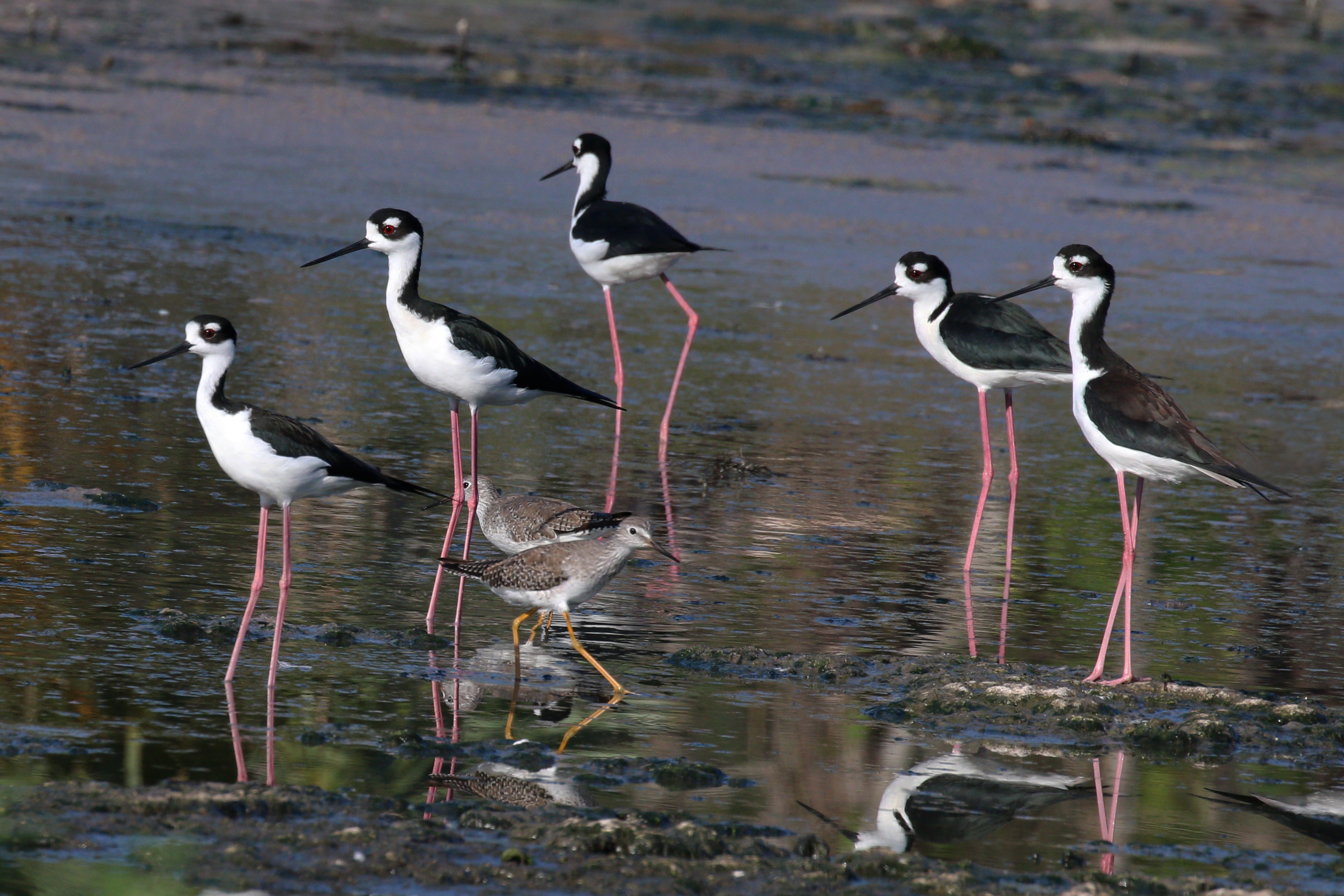
Black-necked stilts

Order: Charadriiformes Family: Recurvirostridae

Recurvirostridae is a family of large wading birds which includes the avocets and stilts. The avocets have long legs and long up-curved bills. The stilts have extremely long legs and long, thin, straight bills.

Common name	Binomial	Status
Black-necked stilt	Himantopus mexicanus	
American avocet	Recurvirostra americana	

== Oystercatchers ==
Order: Charadriiformes Family: Haematopodidae

The oystercatchers are large and noisy plover-like birds, with strong bills used for smashing or prising open molluscs.

Common name	Binomial	Status
American oystercatcher	Haematopus palliatus	

== Plovers and lapwings ==
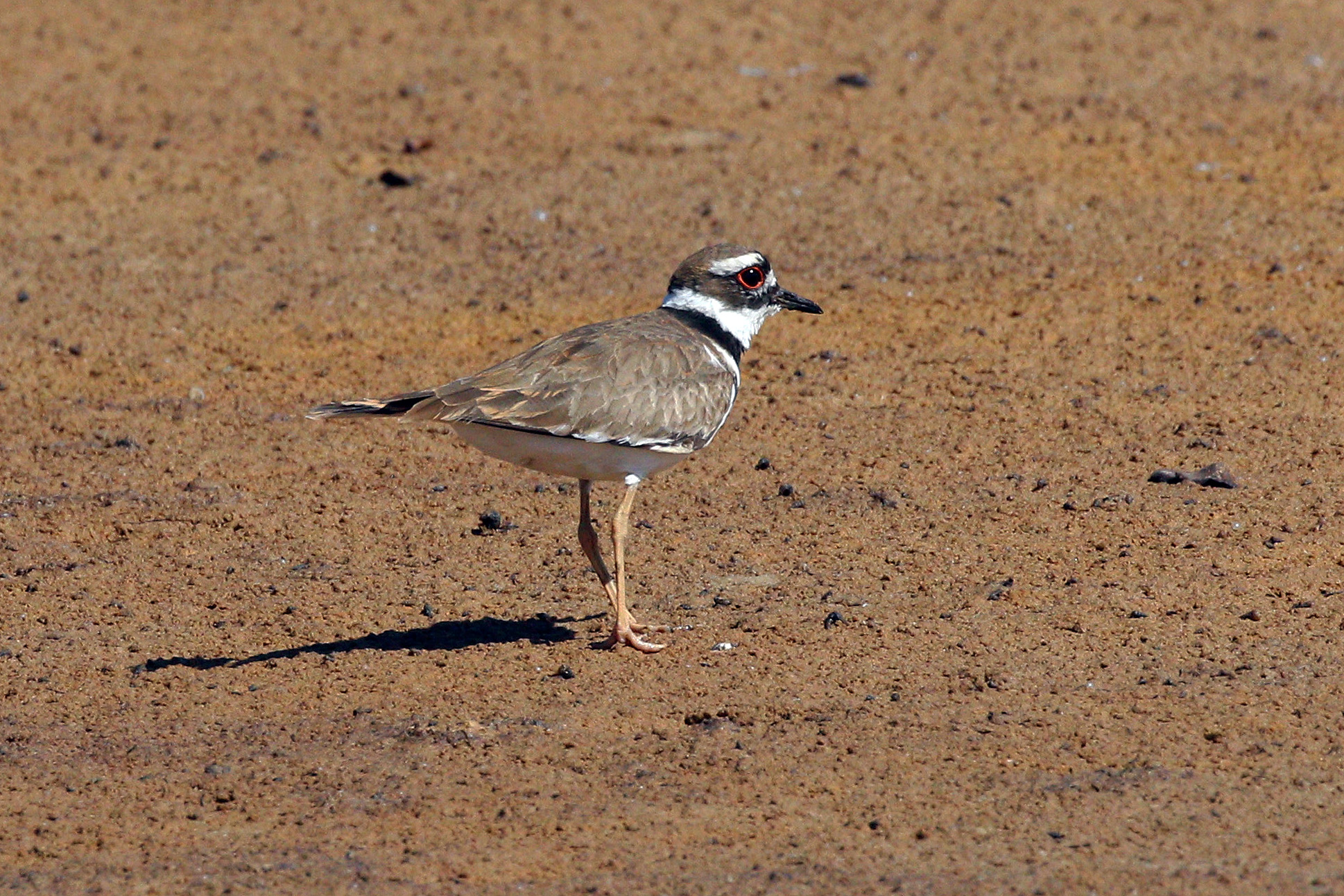
Killdeer

Order: Charadriiformes Family: Charadriidae

The family Charadriidae includes the plovers, dotterels, and lapwings. They are small to medium-sized birds with compact bodies, short thick necks, and long, usually pointed, wings. They are found in open country worldwide, mostly in habitats near water.

Common name	Binomial	Status
Black-bellied plover	Pluvialis squatarola	
American golden-plover	Pluvialis dominica	
Killdeer	Charadrius vociferus	
Semipalmated plover	Charadrius semipalmatus	
Piping plover	Charadrius melodus	near-threatened
Wilson's plover	Charadrius wilsonia	
Snowy plover	Charadrius nivosus	near-threatened

== Jacanas ==
Order: Charadriiformes Family: Jacanidae

The jacanas are a group of waders which are found throughout the tropics. They are identifiable by their huge feet and claws which enable them to walk on floating vegetation in the shallow lakes that are their preferred habitat.

Common name	Binomial	Status
Northern jacana	Jacana spinosa	

== Sandpipers and allies ==
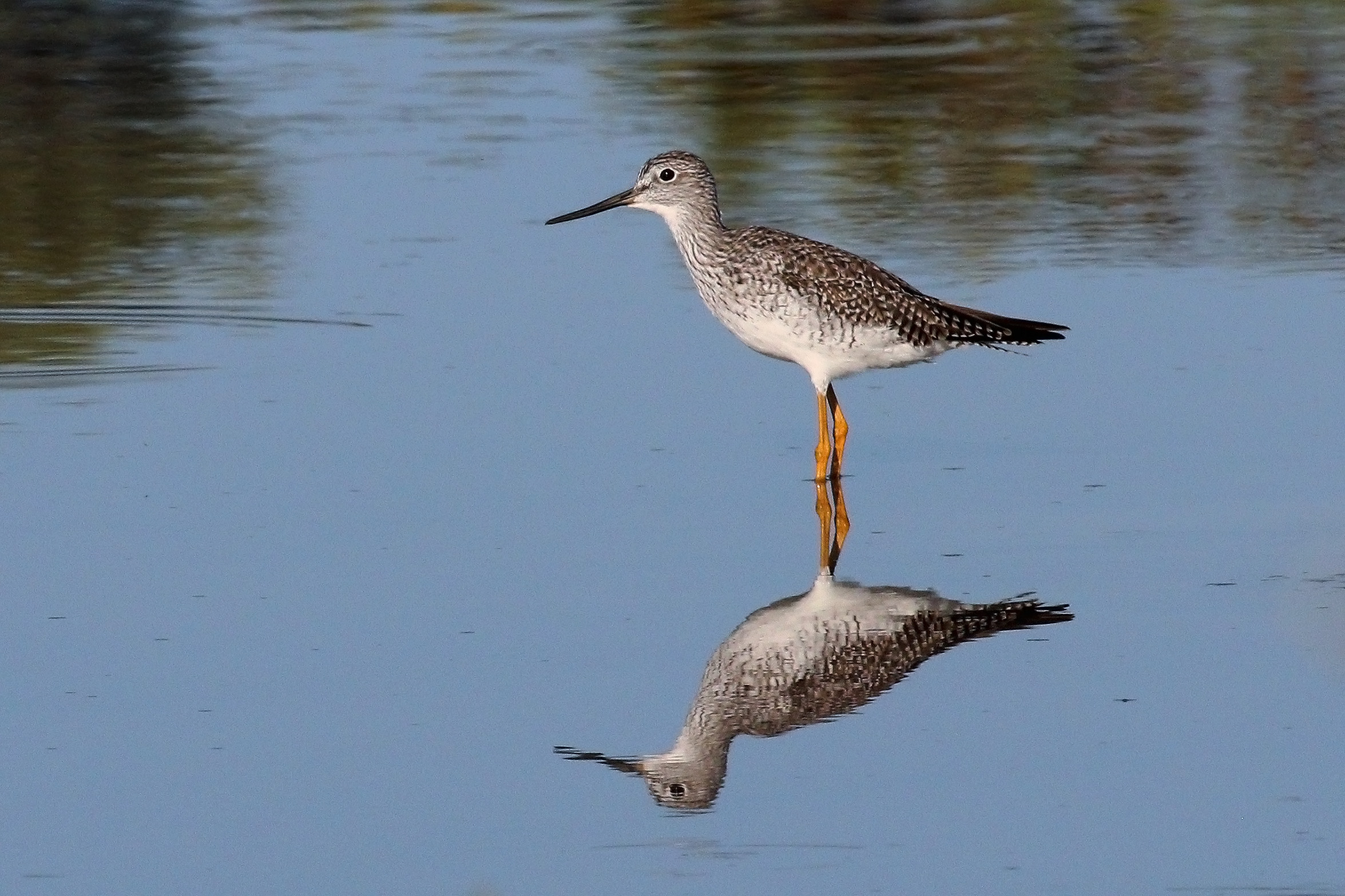
Greater yellowlegs

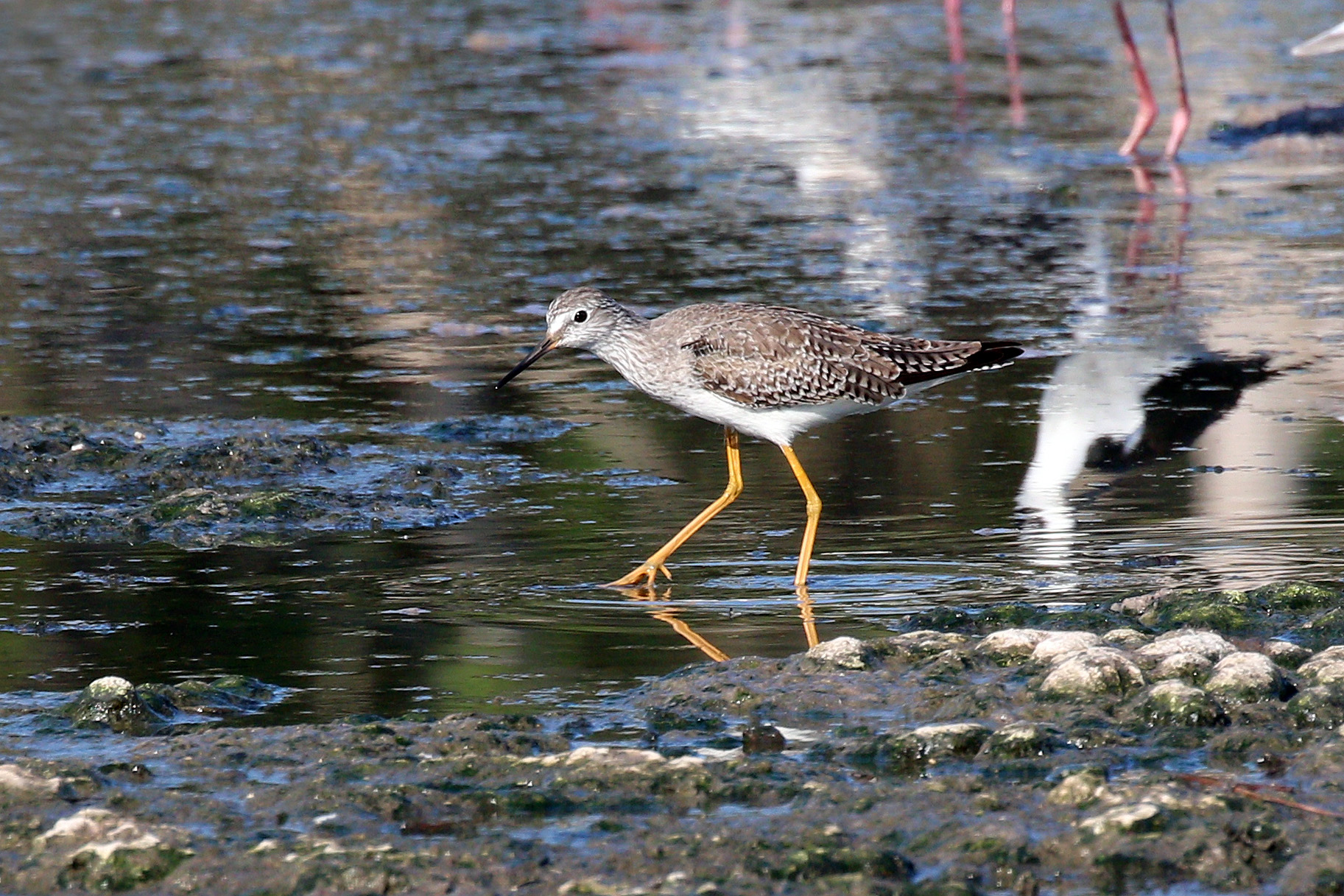
Lesser yellowlegs

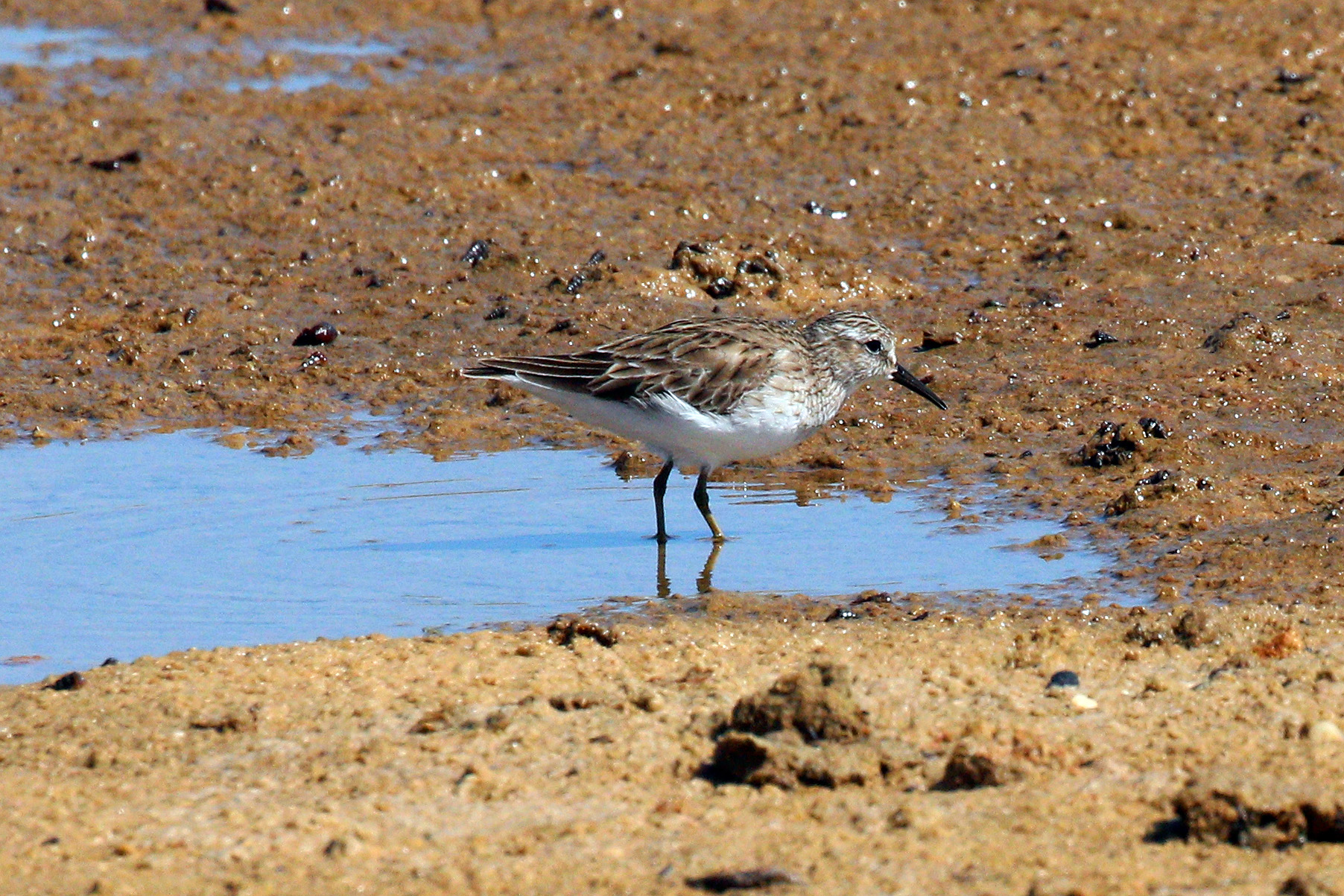
Least sandpiper

Order: Charadriiformes Family: Scolopacidae

Scolopacidae is a large diverse family of small to medium-sized shorebirds including the sandpipers, curlews, godwits, shanks, tattlers, woodcocks, snipes, dowitchers, and phalaropes. The majority of these species eat small invertebrates picked out of the mud or soil. Variation in length of legs and bills enables multiple species to feed in the same habitat, particularly on the coast, without direct competition for food.

Common name	Binomial	Status
Upland sandpiper	Bartramia longicauda	
Whimbrel	Numenius phaeopus	
Long-billed curlew	Numenius americanus	(R)
Hudsonian godwit	Limosa haemastica	(R)
Marbled godwit	Limosa fedoa	
Ruddy turnstone	Arenaria interpres	
Red knot	Calidris canutus	near-threatened
Ruff	Calidris pugnax	(R)
Stilt sandpiper	Calidris himantopus	
Curlew sandpiper	Calidris ferruginea	(H)
Sanderling	Calidris alba	
Dunlin	Calidris alpina	(R)
Least sandpiper	Calidris minutilla	
White-rumped sandpiper	Calidris fuscicollis	
Buff-breasted sandpiper	Calidris subruficollis	(R) near-threatened
Pectoral sandpiper	Calidris melanotos	
Semipalmated sandpiper	Calidris pusilla	near-threatened
Western sandpiper	Calidris mauri	
Short-billed dowitcher	Limnodromus griseus	
Long-billed dowitcher	Limnodromus scolopaceus	
Wilson's snipe	Gallinago delicata	
Spotted sandpiper	Actitis macularius	
Solitary sandpiper	Tringa solitaria	
Lesser yellowlegs	Tringa flavipes	
Willet	Tringa semipalmata	
Greater yellowlegs	Tringa melanoleuca	
Wilson's phalarope	Phalaropus tricolor	(R)
Red-necked phalarope	Phalaropus lobatus	(R)
Red phalarope	Phalaropus fulicarius	(R)

== Skuas and jaegers ==
Order: Charadriiformes Family: Stercorariidae

The family Stercorariidae are, in general, medium to large birds, typically with gray or brown plumage, often with white markings on the wings. They nest on the ground in temperate and arctic regions and are long-distance migrants.

Common name	Binomial	Status
South polar skua	Stercorarius maccormicki	(R)
Pomarine jaeger	Stercorarius pomarinus	(R)
Parasitic jaeger	Stercorarius parasiticus	(R)
Long-tailed jaeger	Stercorarius longicaudus	(R)

== Auks, murres, and puffins ==
Order: Charadriiformes Family: Alcidae

Auks are superficially similar to penguins due to their black-and-white colors, their upright posture, and some of their habits.

Common name	Binomial	Status
Dovekie	Alle alle	(R)

== Gulls, terns, and skimmers ==
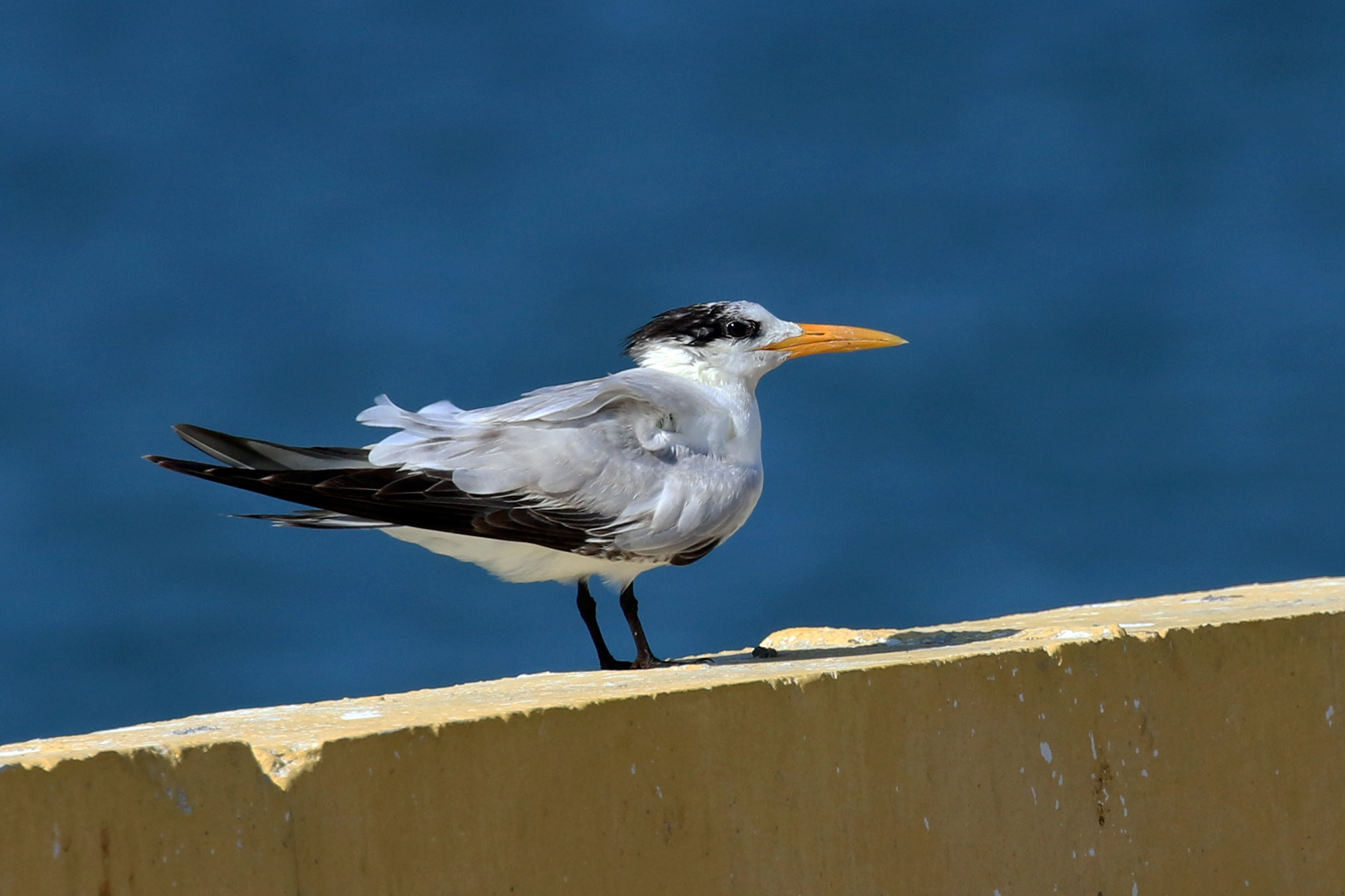
Royal tern

Order: Charadriiformes Family: Laridae

Laridae is a family of medium to large seabirds and includes gulls, kittiwakes, terns and skimmers. They are typically gray or white, often with black markings on the head or wings. They have longish bills and webbed feet. Terns are a group of generally medium to large seabirds typically with gray or white plumage, often with black markings on the head. Most terns hunt fish by diving but some pick insects off the surface of fresh water. Terns are generally long-lived birds, with several species known to live in excess of 30 years. Skimmers are a small family of tropical tern-like birds. They have an elongated lower mandible which they use to feed by flying low over the water surface and skimming the water for small fish.

Common name	Binomial	Status
Black-legged kittiwake	Rissa tridactyla	(R)
Sabine's gull	Xema sabini	(R)
Bonaparte's gull	Chroicocephalus philadelphia	(R)
Black-headed gull	Chroicocephalus ridibundus	(R)
Laughing gull	Leucophaeus atricilla	
Franklin's gull	Leucophaeus pipixcan	(R)
Ring-billed gull	Larus delawarensis	
Herring gull	Larus argentatus	
Lesser black-backed gull	Larus fuscus	(R)
Great black-backed gull	Larus marinus	(R)
Brown noddy	Anous stolidus	
Sooty tern	Onychoprion fuscata	
Bridled tern	Onychoprion anaethetus	
Least tern	Sternula antillarum	
Large-billed tern	Phaetusa simplex	(R)
Gull-billed tern	Gelochelidon nilotica	
Caspian tern	Hydroprogne caspia	
Black tern	Chlidonias niger	(R)
Roseate tern	Sterna dougallii	(R)
Common tern	Sterna hirundo	
Arctic tern	Sterna paradisaea	(R)
Forster's tern	Sterna forsteri	
Royal tern	Thalasseus maxima	
Sandwich tern	Thalasseus sandvicensis	
Black skimmer	Rynchops niger	

== Tropicbirds ==
Order: Phaethontiformes Family: Phaethontidae

Tropicbirds are slender white birds of tropical oceans with exceptionally long central tail feathers. Their heads and long wings have black markings.

Common name	Binomial	Status
White-tailed tropicbird	Phaethon lepturus	(R)
Red-billed tropicbird	Phaethon aethereus	(R)

== Loons ==
Order: Gaviiformes Family: Gaviidae

Loons, known as divers in Europe, are a group of aquatic birds found in many parts of North America and northern Europe. It is the size of a large duck or small goose, which it somewhat resemble when swimming, but is completely unrelated to these waterfowl.

Common name	Binomial	Status
Common loon	Gavia immer	

== Southern storm-petrels ==
Order: Procellariiformes Family: Oceanitidae

The storm-petrels are the smallest seabirds, relatives of the petrels, feeding on planktonic crustaceans and small fish picked from the surface, typically while hovering. The flight is fluttering and sometimes bat-like. Until 2018, this family's species were included with the other storm-petrels in family Hydrobatidae.

Common name	Binomial	Status
Wilson's storm-petrel	Oceanites oceanicus	(R)

== Northern storm-petrels ==
Order: Procellariiformes Family: Hydrobatidae

Though the members of this family are similar in many respects to the southern storm-petrels, including their general appearance and habits, there are enough genetic differences to warrant their placement in a separate family.

Common name	Binomial	Status
Leach's storm-petrel	Hydrobates leucorhous	(R)
Band-rumped storm-petrel	Hydrobates castro	(R)

== Shearwaters and petrels ==
Order: Procellariiformes Family: Procellariidae

The procellariids are the main group of medium-sized "true petrels", characterised by united nostrils with medium septum and a long outer functional primary.

Common name	Binomial	Status
Black-capped petrel	Pterodroma hasitata	(R)
Cory's shearwater	Calonectris diomedea	(R)
Sooty shearwater	Ardenna griseus	(R) near-threatened
Great shearwater	Ardenna gravis	(R)
Sargasso shearwater	Puffinus lherminieri	(R)

== Storks ==
Order: Ciconiiformes Family: Ciconiidae

Storks are large, long-legged, long-necked, wading birds with long, stout bills. Storks are mute, but bill-clattering is an important mode of communication at the nest. Their nests can be large and may be reused for many years. Many species are migratory.

Common name	Binomial	Status
Wood stork	Mycteria americana	

== Frigatebirds ==
Order: Suliformes Family: Fregatidae

Frigatebirds are large seabirds usually found over tropical oceans. They are large, black-and-white, or completely black, with long wings and deeply forked tails. The males have colored inflatable throat pouches. They do not swim or walk and cannot take off from a flat surface. Having the largest wingspan-to-body-weight ratio of any bird, they are essentially aerial, able to stay aloft for more than a week.

Common name	Binomial	Status
Magnificent frigatebird	Fregata magnificens	

== Boobies and gannets ==
Order: Suliformes Family: Sulidae

The sulids comprise the gannets and boobies. Both groups are medium to large coastal seabirds that plunge-dive for fish.

Common name	Binomial	Status
Masked booby	Sula dactylatra	
Brown booby	Sula leucogaster	
Red-footed booby	Sula sula	
Northern gannet	Morus bassanus	

== Anhingas ==
Order: Suliformes Family: Anhingidae

Anhingas are often called "snake-birds" because of their long thin neck, which gives a snake-like appearance when they swim with their bodies submerged. The males have black and dark-brown plumage, an erectile crest on the nape, and a larger bill than the female. The females have much paler plumage especially on the neck and underparts. The darters have completely webbed feet and their legs are short and set far back on the body. Their plumage is somewhat permeable, like that of cormorants, and they spread their wings to dry after diving.

Common name	Binomial	Status
Anhinga	Anhinga anhinga	

== Cormorants and shags ==
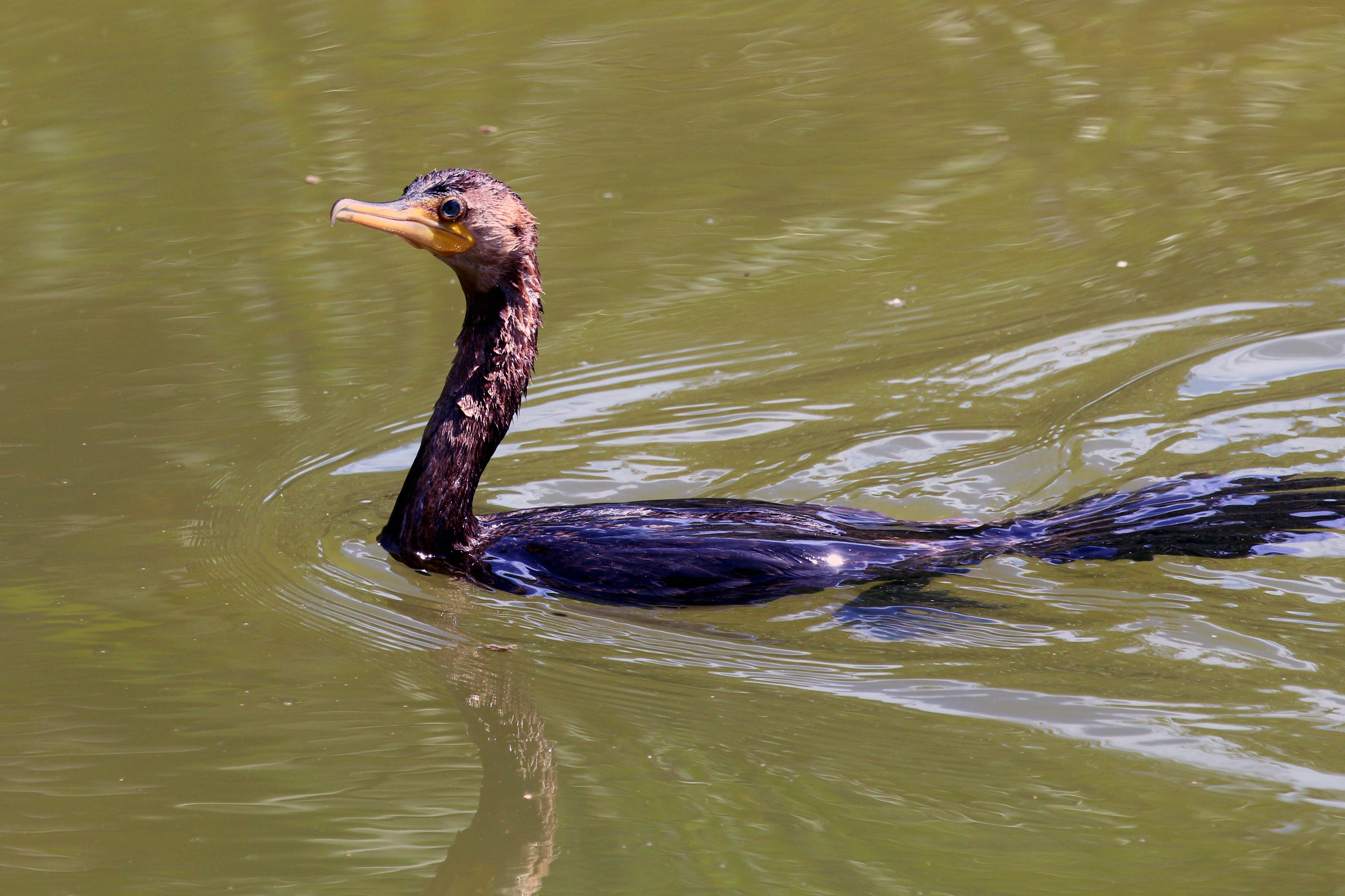
Neotropic cormorant

Order: Suliformes Family: Phalacrocoracidae

Phalacrocoracidae is a family of medium to large coastal, fish-eating seabirds that includes cormorants and shags. Plumage coloration varies, with the majority having mainly dark plumage, some species being black-and-white, and a few being colorful.

Common name	Binomial	Status
Double-crested cormorant	Nannopterum auritum	
Neotropic cormorant	Nannopterum brasilianum	

== Pelicans ==
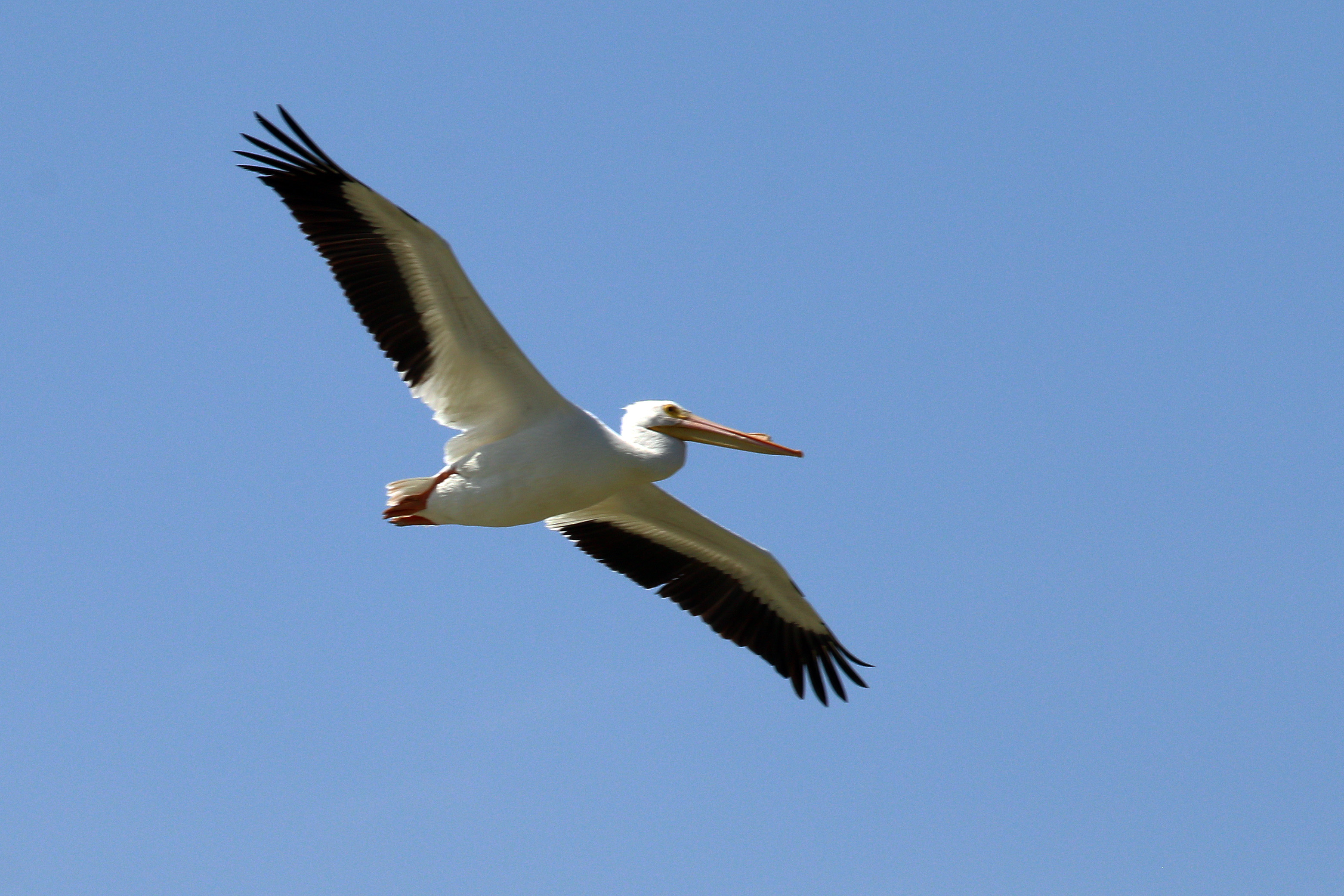
American white pelican

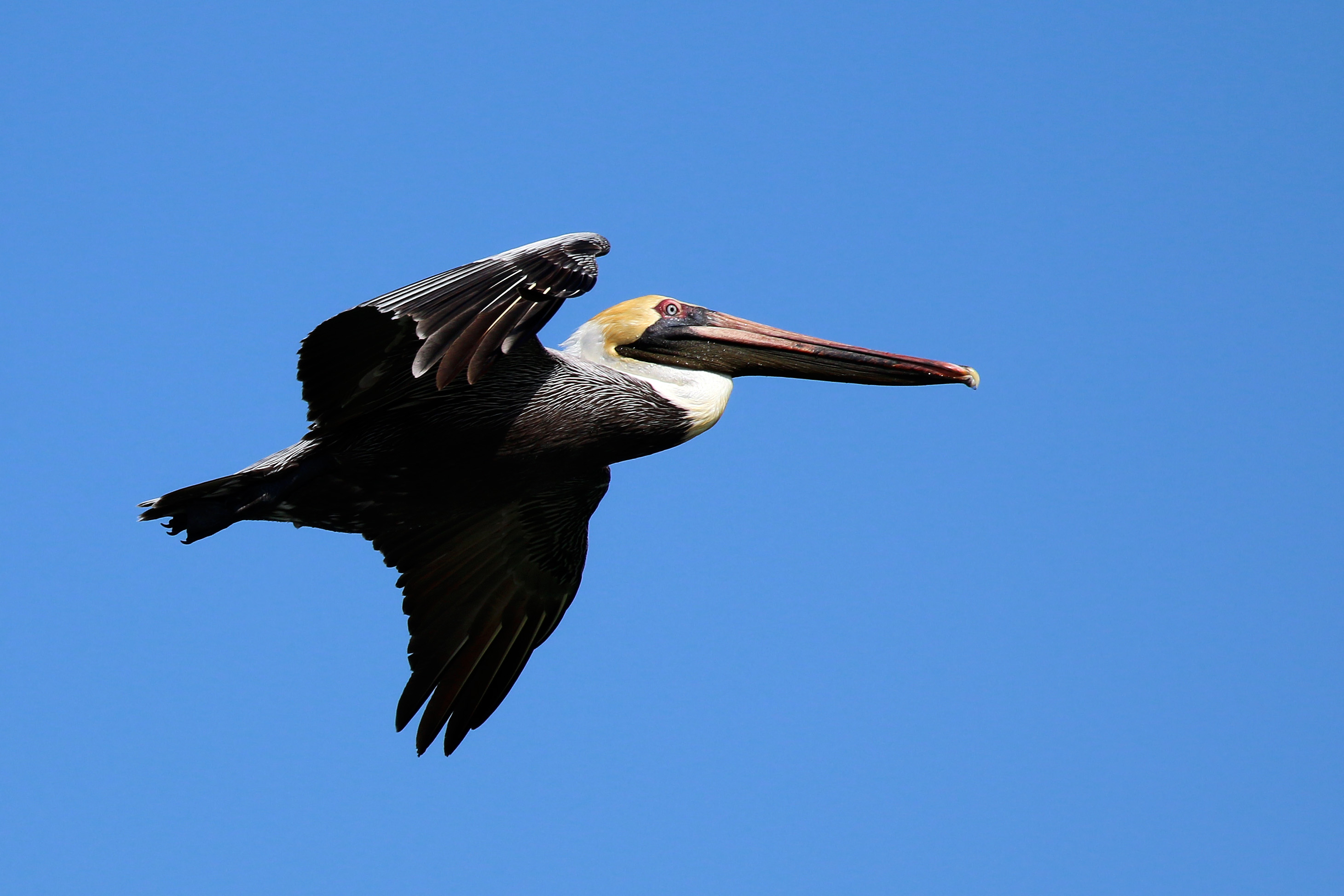
Brown pelican

Order: Pelecaniformes Family: Pelecanidae

Pelicans are large water birds with a distinctive pouch under their beak. As with other members of the order Pelecaniformes, they have webbed feet with four toes.

Common name	Binomial	Status
American white pelican	Pelecanus erythrorhynchos	
Brown pelican	Pelecanus occidentalis	

== Herons, egrets, and bitterns ==
Order: Pelecaniformes Family: Ardeidae

The family Ardeidae contains the bitterns, herons, and egrets. Herons and egrets are medium to large wading birds with long necks and legs. Bitterns tend to be shorter necked and more wary. Members of Ardeidae fly with their necks retracted, unlike other long-necked birds such as storks, ibises, and spoonbills.

Common name	Binomial	Status
American bittern	Botaurus lentiginosus	
Least bittern	Ixobrychus exilis	
Great blue heron	Ardea herodias	
Great egret	Ardea alba	
Snowy egret	Egretta thula	
Little blue heron	Egretta caerulea	
Tricolored heron	Egretta tricolor	
Reddish egret	Egretta rufescens	Near-threatened
Cattle egret	Bubulcus ibis	
Green heron	Butorides virescens	
Black-crowned night-heron	Nycticorax nycticorax	
Yellow-crowned night-heron	Nyctanassa violacea	

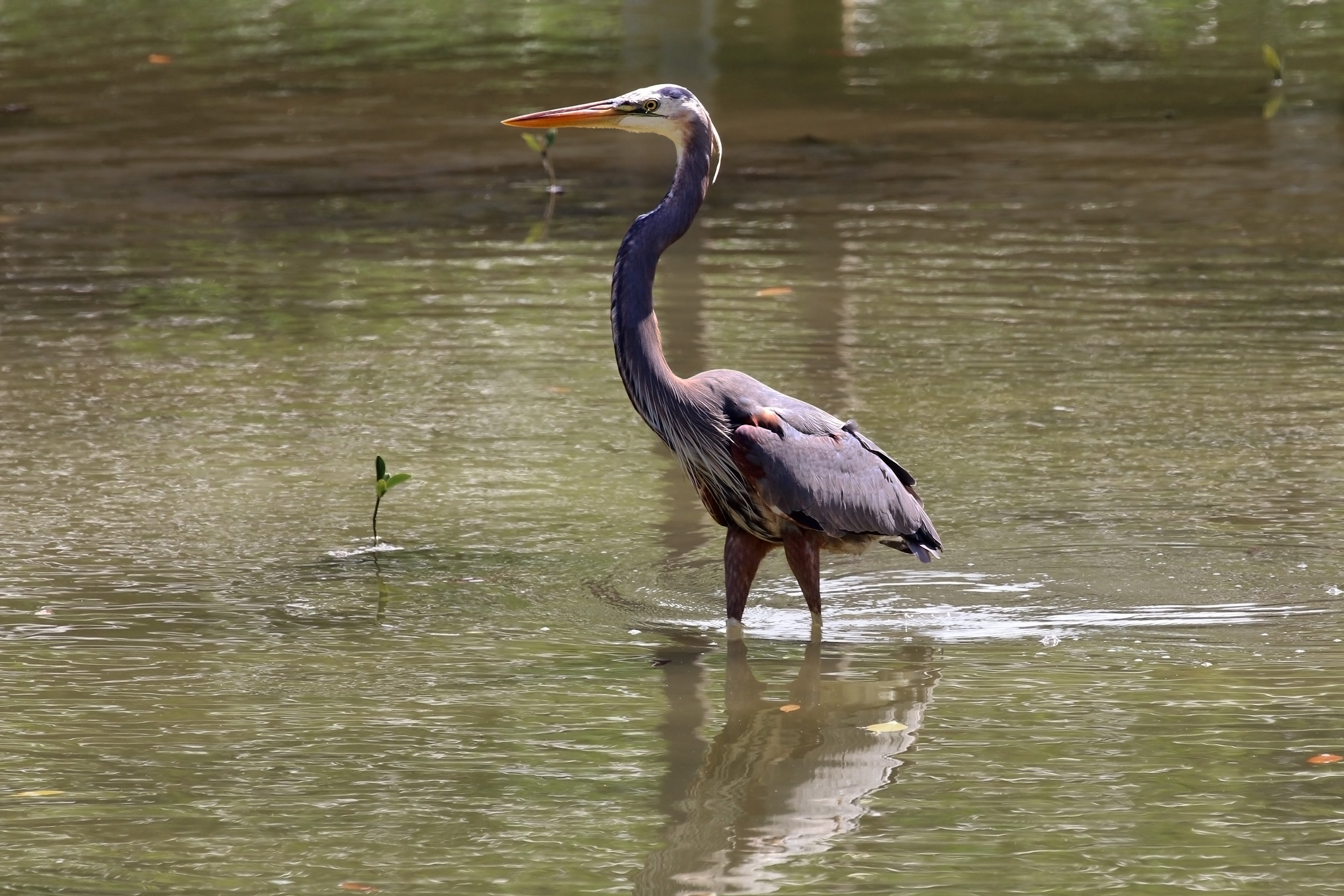
Great blue heron (dark form)

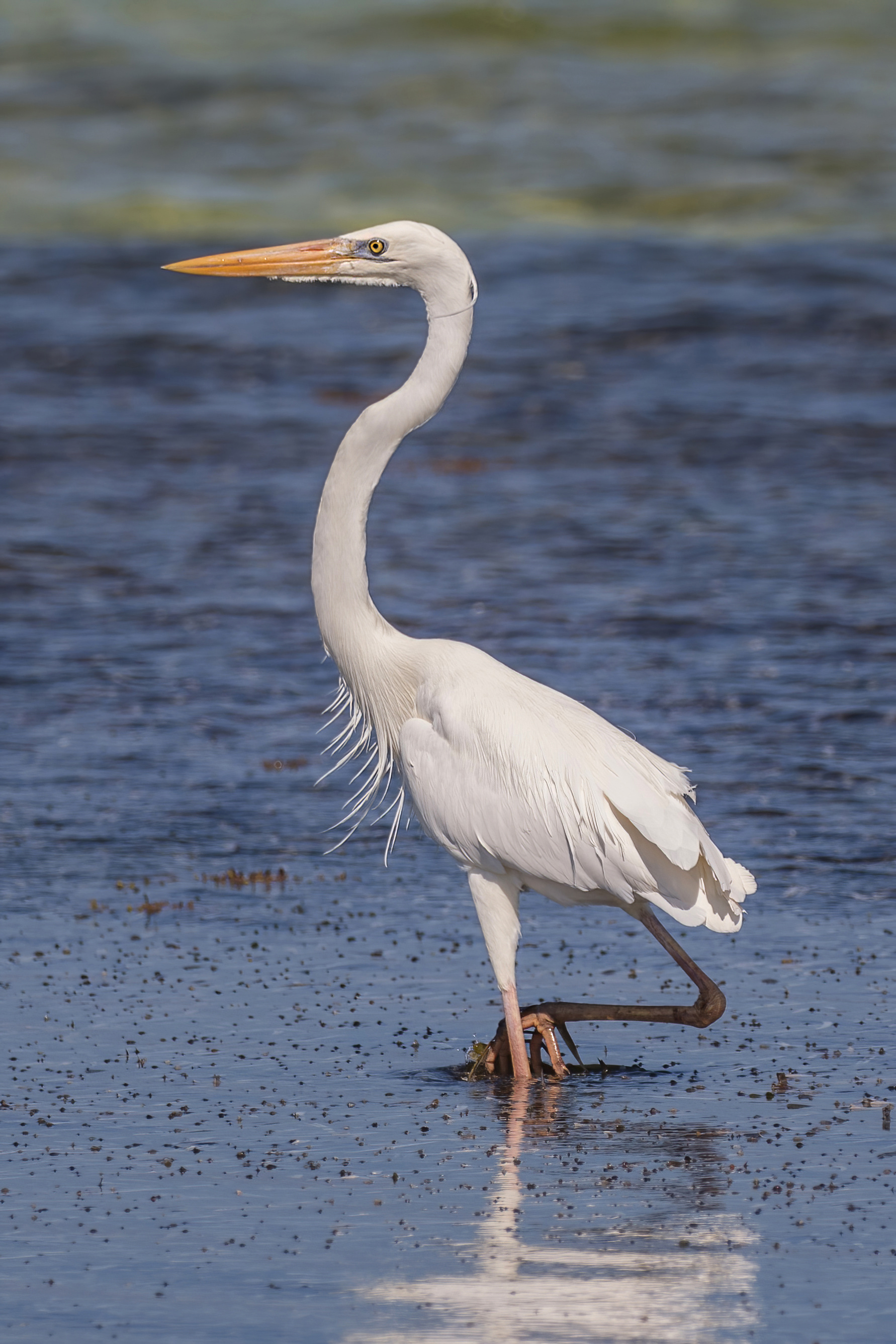
Great blue heron (white form)

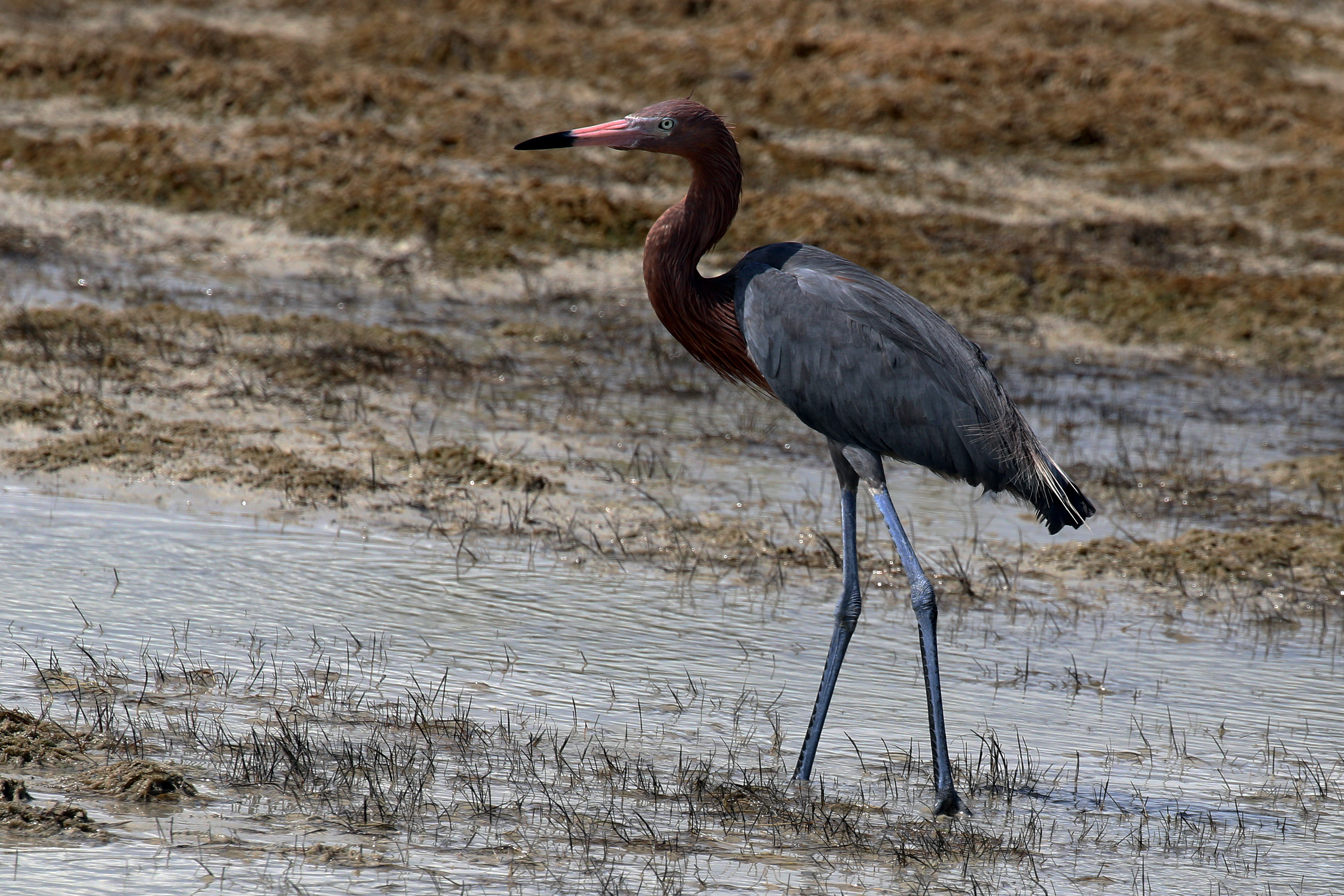
Reddish egret (dark form)

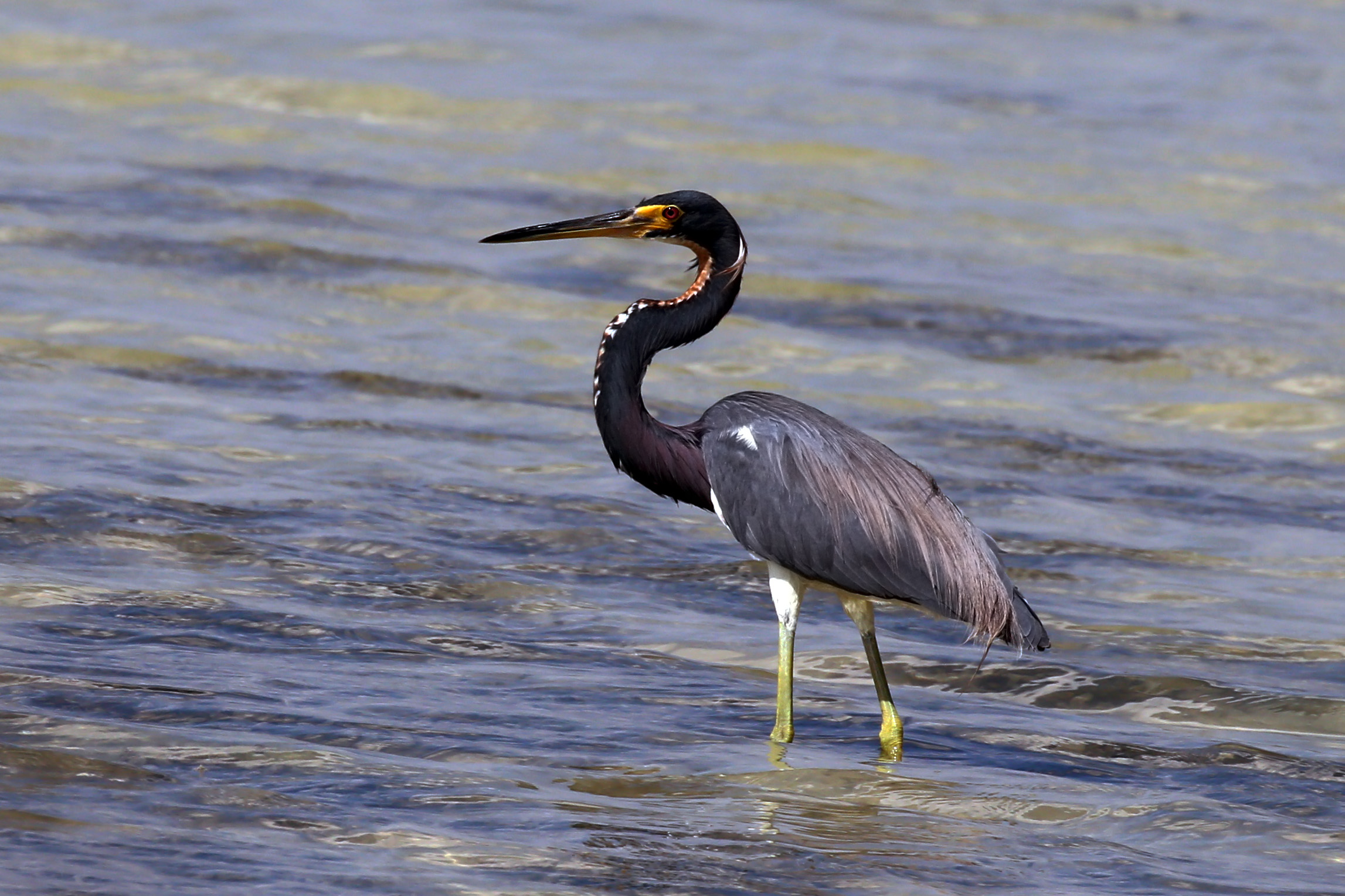
Tricolored heron

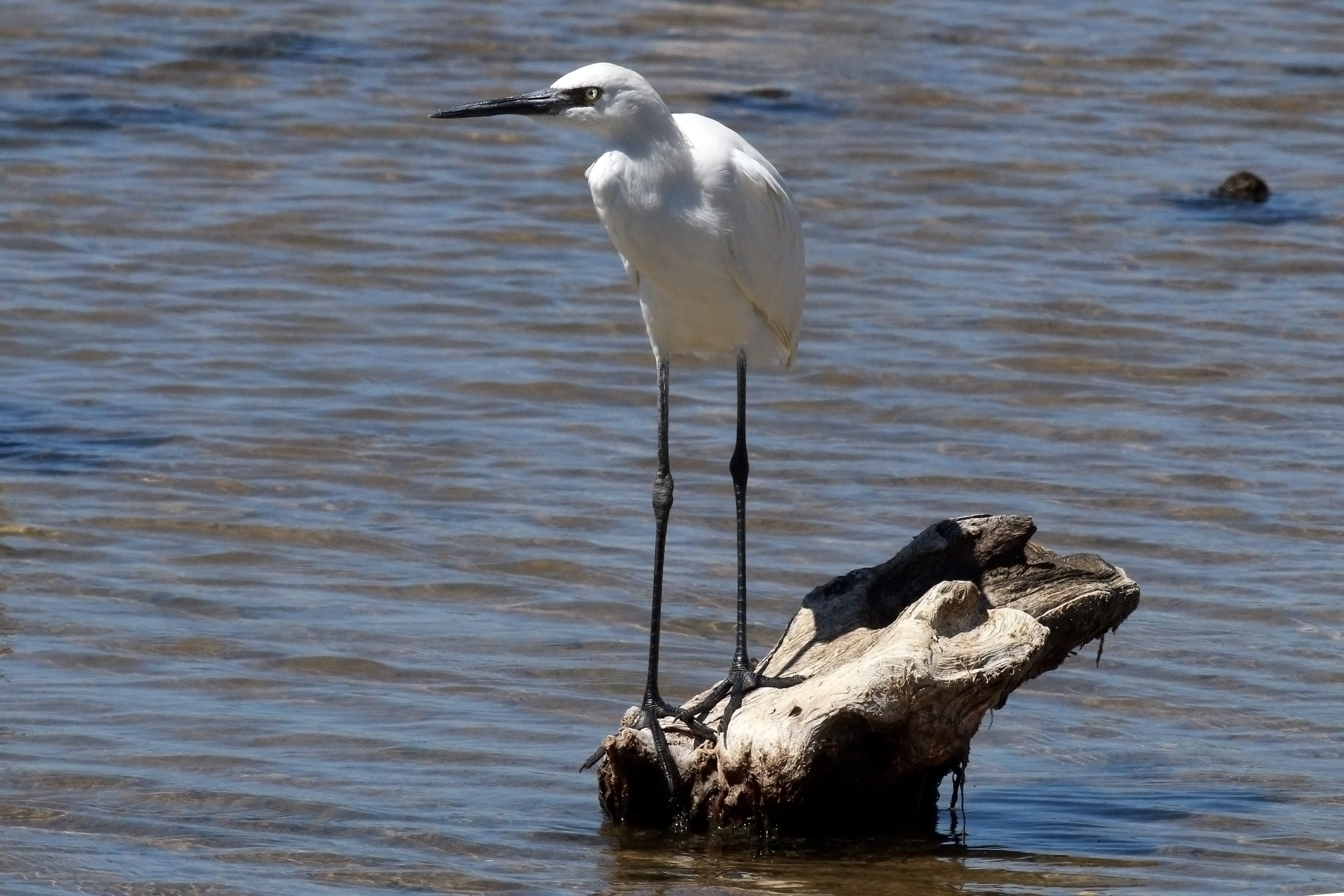
Little blue heron, immature

== Ibises and spoonbills ==
Order: Pelecaniformes Family: Threskiornithidae

Threskiornithidae is a family of large terrestrial and wading birds which includes the ibises and spoonbills. They have long, broad wings with 11 primary and about 20 secondary feathers. They are strong fliers and despite their size and weight, very capable soarers.

Common name	Binomial	Status
White ibis	Eudocimus albus	
Scarlet ibis	Eudocimus ruber	(R)
Glossy ibis	Plegadis falcinellus	
White-faced ibis	Plegadis chihi	(R)
Roseate spoonbill	Platalea ajaja	

== New World vultures ==
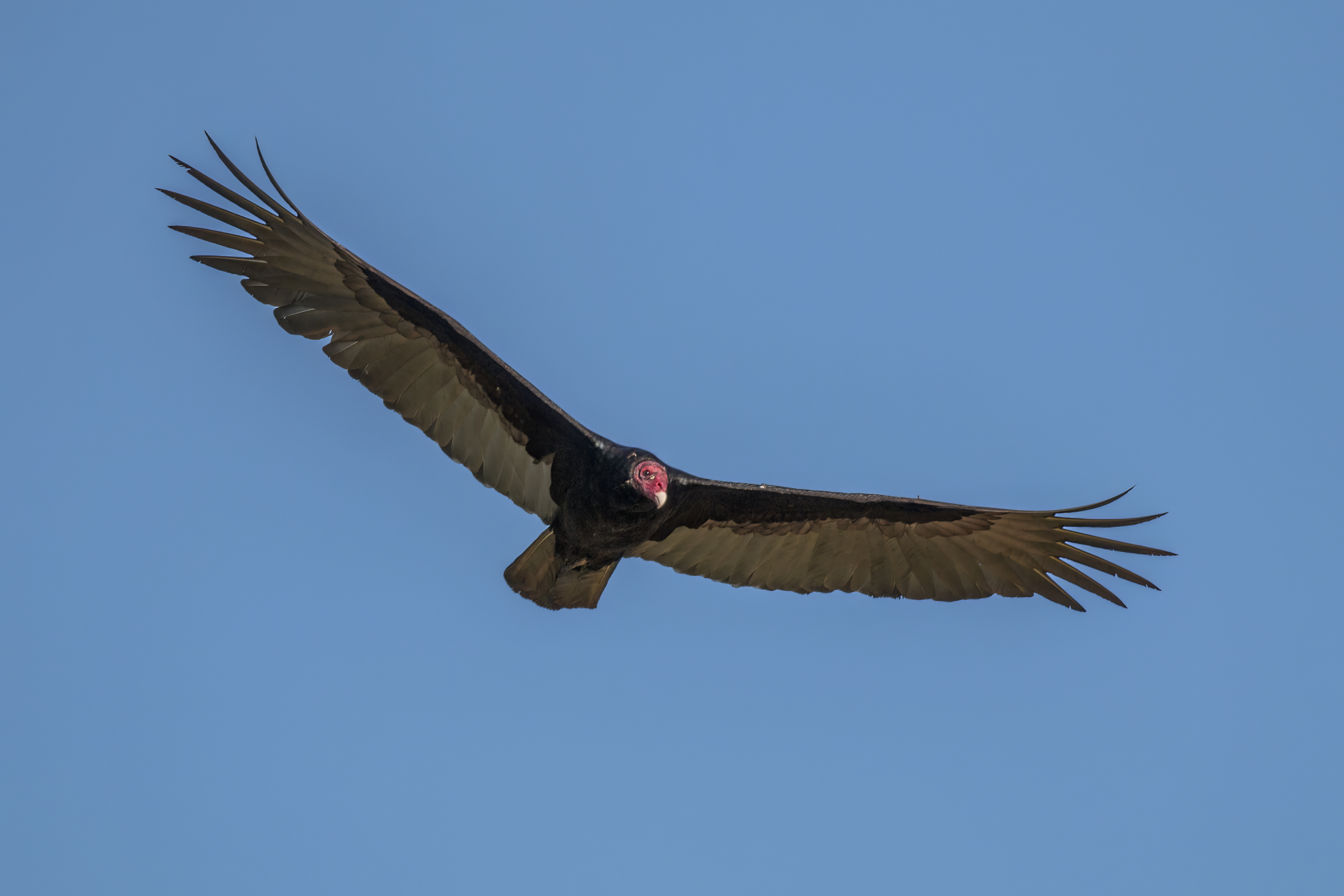
Turkey vulture

Order: Cathartiformes Family: Cathartidae The New World vultures are not closely related to Old World vultures, but superficially resemble them because of convergent evolution. Like the Old World vultures, they are scavengers. However, unlike Old World vultures, which find carcasses by sight, New World vultures have a good sense of smell with which they locate carrion.

Common name	Binomial	Status
Black vulture	Coragyps atratus	(R)
Turkey vulture	Cathartes aura	

== Osprey ==
Order: Accipitriformes Family: Pandionidae

The family Pandionidae contains only one species, the osprey. The osprey is a medium-large raptor which is a specialist fish-eater with a worldwide distribution.

Common name	Binomial	Status
Osprey	Pandion haliaetus	

== Hawks, eagles, and kites ==
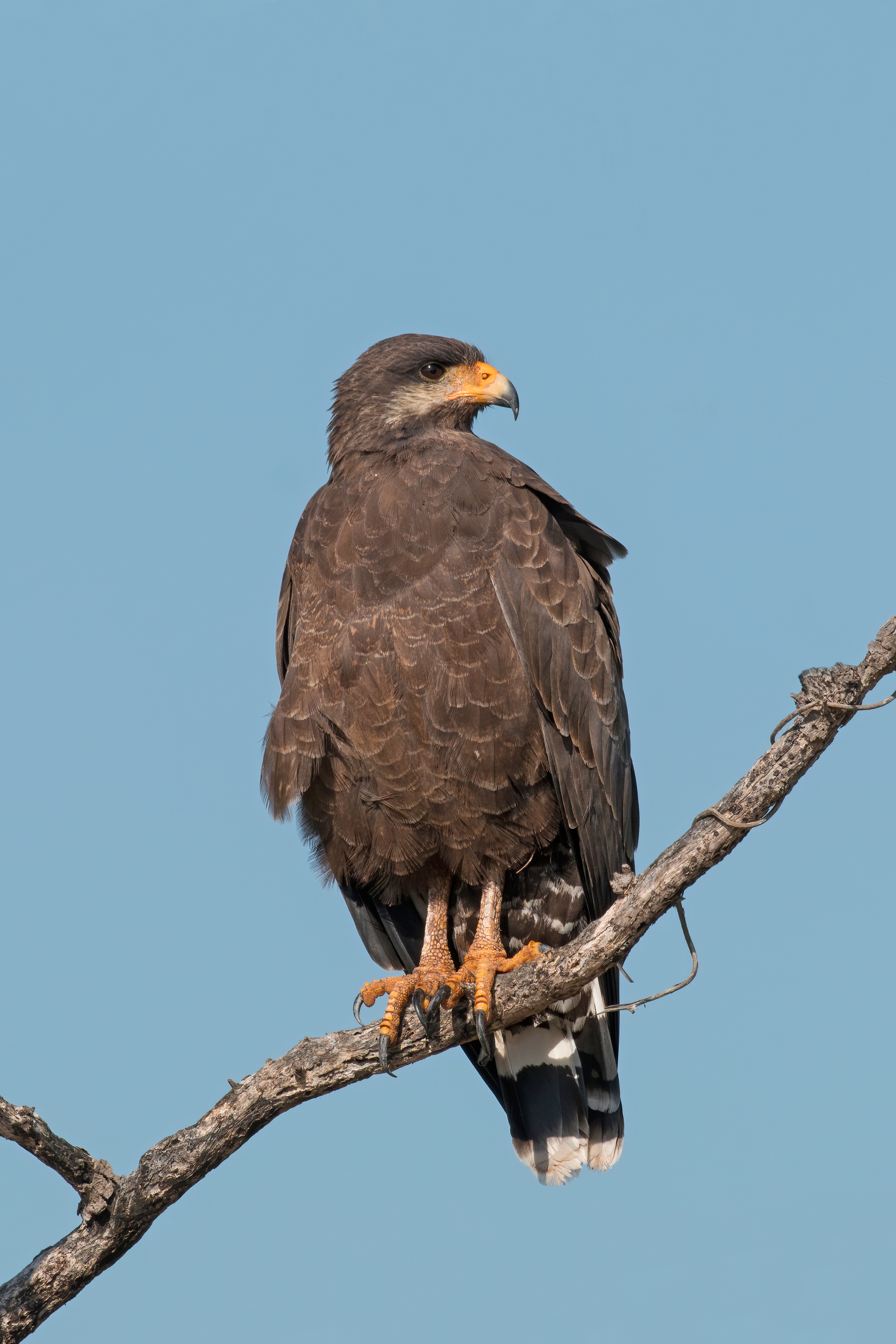
Cuban black hawk

Order: Accipitriformes Family: Accipitridae

Accipitridae is a family of birds of prey which includes hawks, eagles, kites, harriers, and Old World vultures. These birds have powerful hooked beaks for tearing flesh from their prey, strong legs, powerful talons, and keen eyesight.

Common name	Binomial	Status
Cuban kite	Chondrohierax wilsonii	(E)
Swallow-tailed kite	Elanoides forficatus	
Northern harrier	Circus hudsonius	
Sharp-shinned hawk	Accipiter striatus fringilloides	(Es)
Cooper's hawk	Accipiter cooperii	(R)
Gundlach's hawk	Accipiter gundlachi	(E) endangered
Bald eagle	Haliaeetus leucocephalus	(R)
Mississippi kite	Ictinia mississippiensis	
Snail kite	Rostrhamus sociabilis	
Cuban black hawk	Buteogallus gundlachii	(E) Near-threatened
Broad-winged hawk	Buteo platypterus cubanensis	(Es)
Short-tailed hawk	Buteo brachyurus	(R)
Swainson's hawk	Buteo swainsoni	(R)
Red-tailed hawk	Buteo jamaicensis	

== Barn-owls ==
Order: Strigiformes Family: Tytonidae

Barn-owls are medium to large owls with large heads and characteristic heart-shaped faces. They have long strong legs with powerful talons.

Common name	Binomial	Status
Barn owl	Tyto alba	

== Owls ==
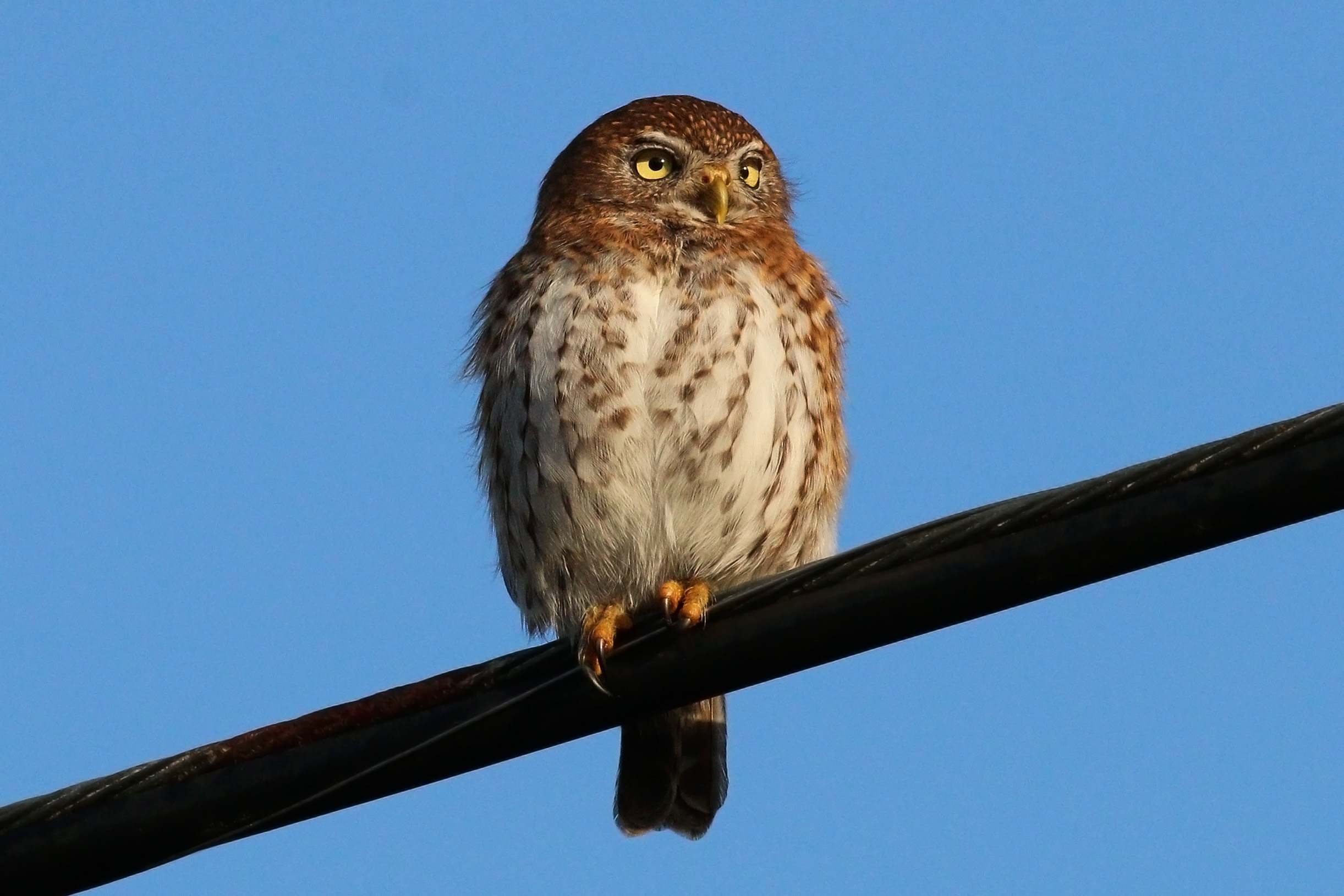
Cuban pygmy-owl

Order: Strigiformes Family: Strigidae

The typical owls are small to large solitary nocturnal birds of prey. They have large forward-facing eyes and ears, a hawk-like beak, and a conspicuous circle of feathers around each eye called a facial disk.

Common name	Binomial	Status
Bare-legged owl	Margarobyas lawrencii	(E)
Cuban pygmy-owl	Glaucidium siju	(E)
Burrowing owl	Athene cunicularia	
Giant cuban owl	Ornimegalonyx oterio	extinct
Long-eared owl	Asio otus	(R)
Stygian owl	Asio stygius suguapa	(Es)
Short-eared owl	Asio flammeus	

== Trogons ==
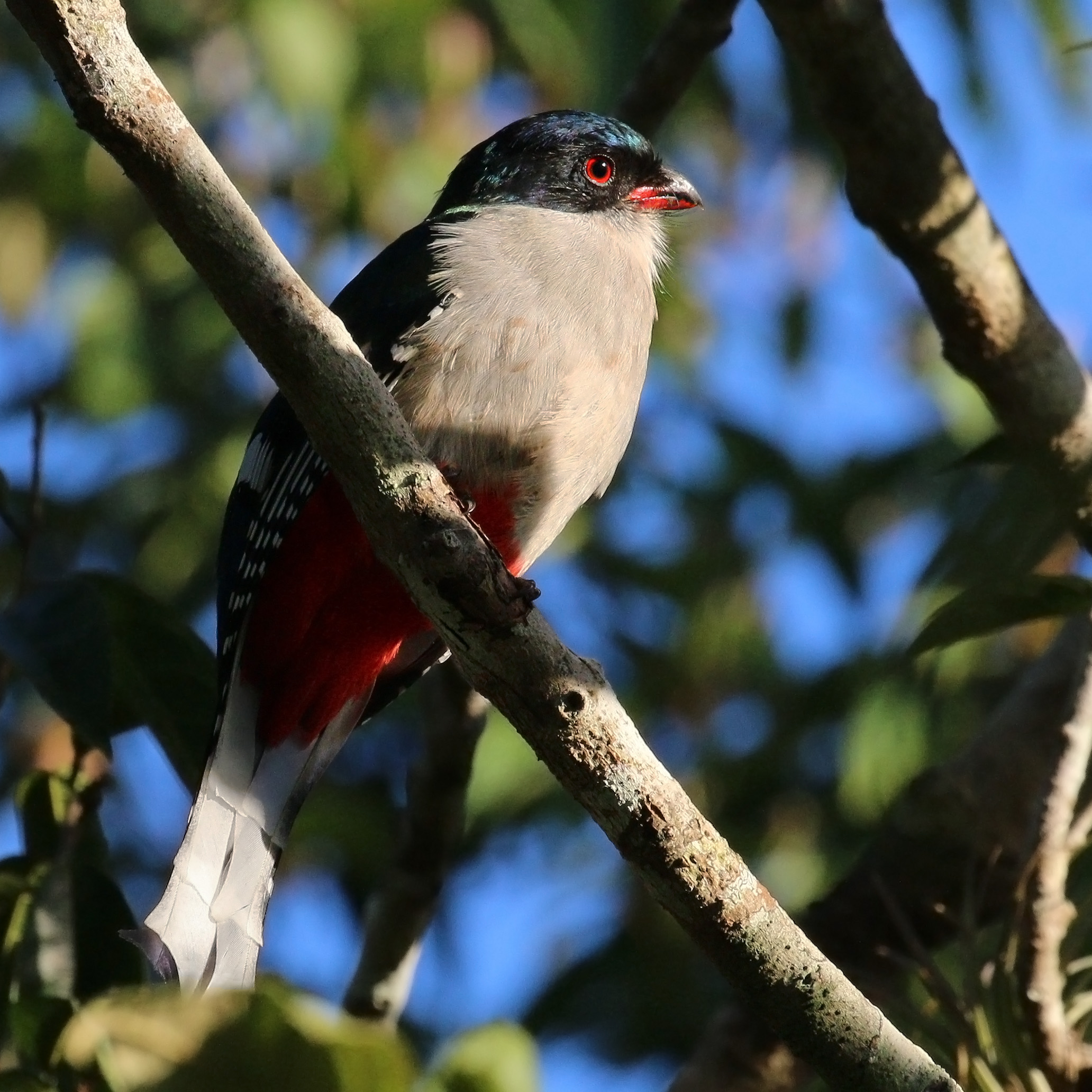
Cuban trogon

Order: Trogoniformes Family: Trogonidae

The family Trogonidae includes trogons and quetzals. Found in tropical woodlands worldwide, they feed on insects and fruit, and their broad bills and weak legs reflect their diet and arboreal habits. Although their flight is fast, they are reluctant to fly any distance. Trogons have soft, often colorful, feathers with distinctive male and female plumage.

Common name	Binomial	Status
Cuban trogon	Priotelus temnurus	(E)

== Todies ==
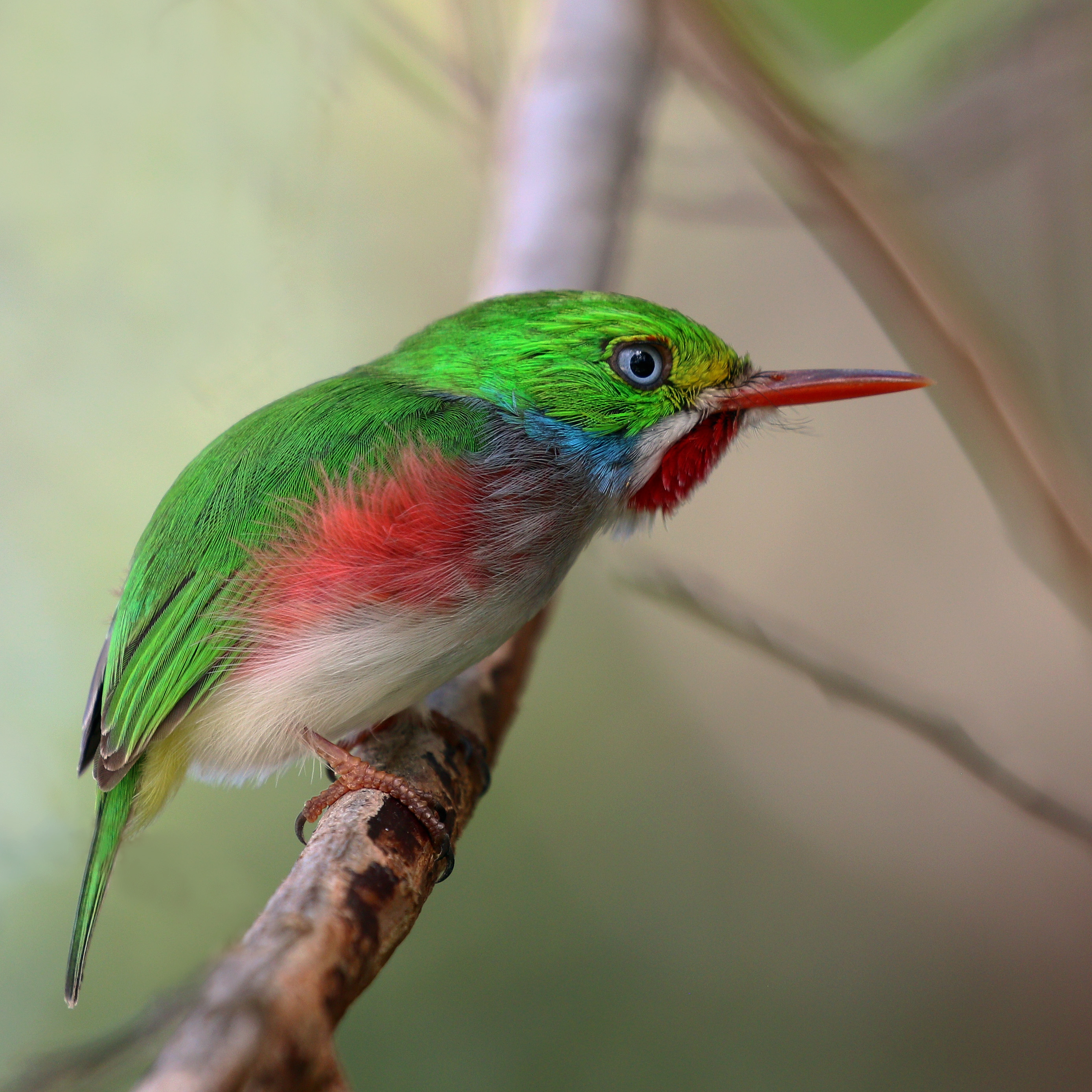
Cuban tody

Order: Coraciiformes Family: Todidae

Todies are a group of small near passerine forest species endemic to the Caribbean. These birds have colorful plumage and resemble small kingfishers, but have flattened bills with serrated edges. They eat small prey such as insects and lizards.

Common name	Binomial	Status
Cuban tody	Todus multicolor	(E)

== Kingfishers ==
Order: Coraciiformes Family: Alcedinidae

Water kingfishers are medium-sized birds with large heads, long, pointed bills, short legs, and stubby tails.

Common name	Binomial	Status
Belted kingfisher	Megaceryle alcyon	

== Woodpeckers ==
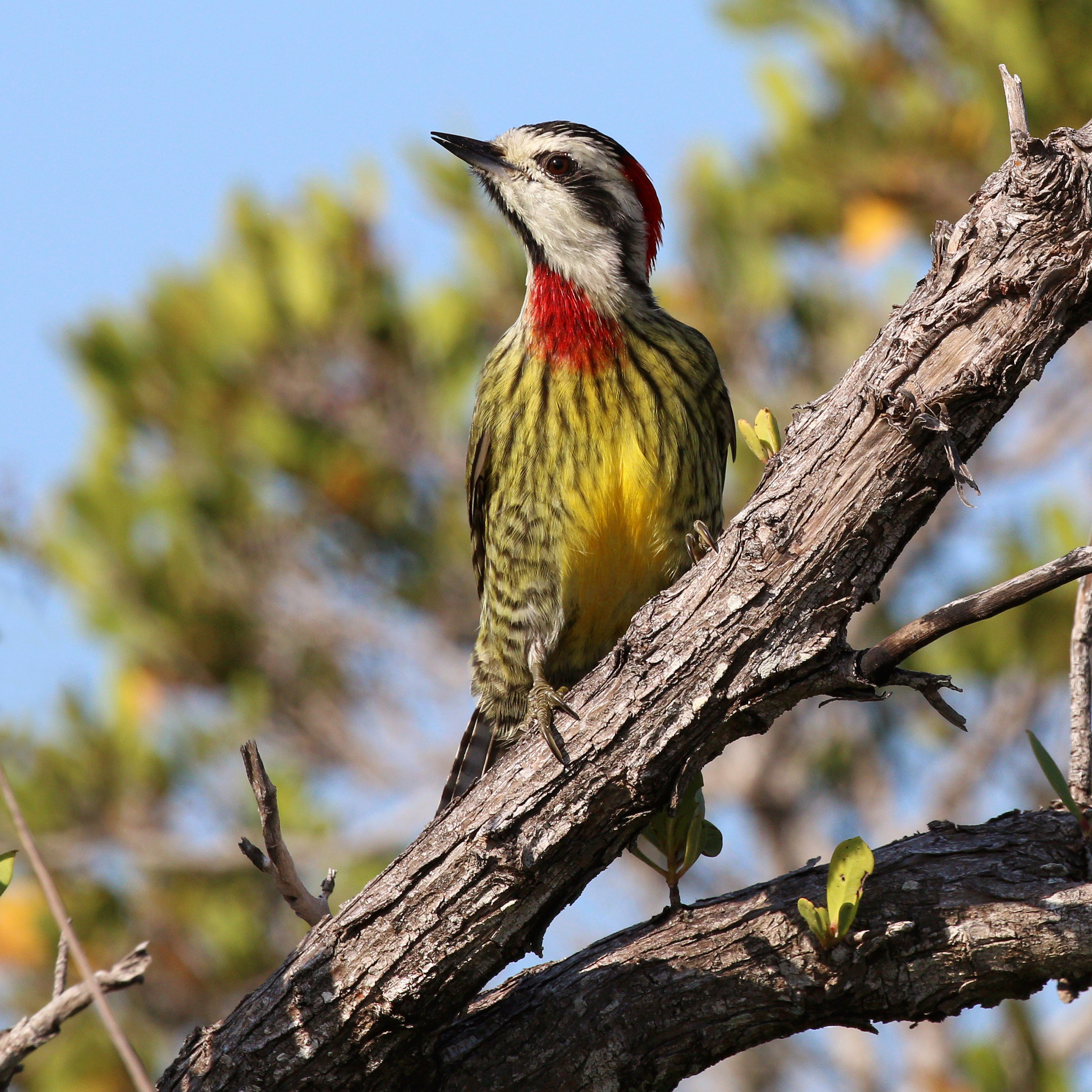
Cuban green woodpecker

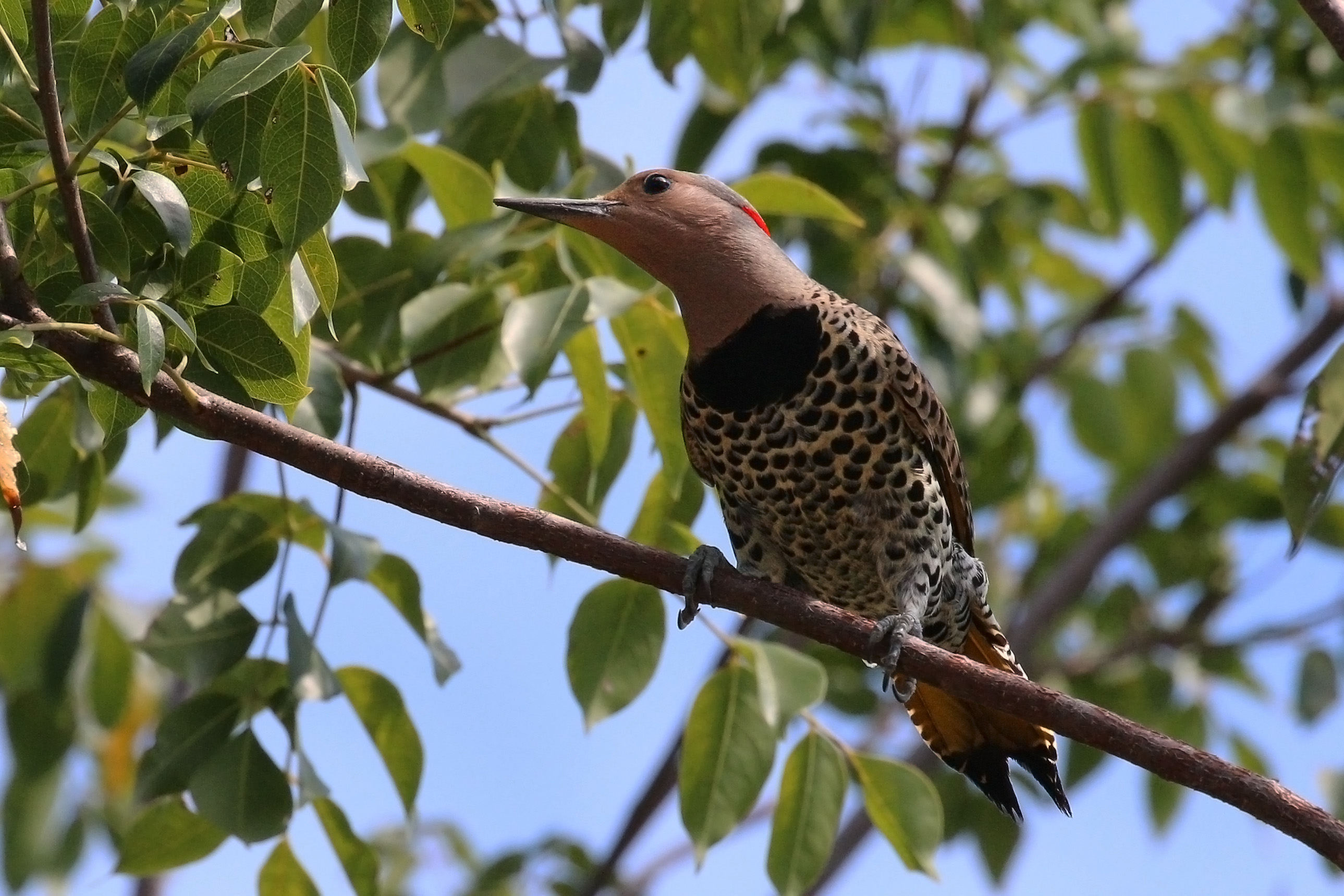
Northern flicker

Order: Piciformes Family: Picidae

Woodpeckers are small to medium-sized birds with chisel-like beaks, short legs, stiff tails, and long tongues used for capturing insects. Some species have feet with two toes pointing forward and two backward, while several species have only three toes. Many woodpeckers have the habit of tapping noisily on tree trunks with their beaks.

Common name	Binomial	Status
West Indian woodpecker	Melanerpes superciliaris	
Yellow-bellied sapsucker	Sphyrapicus varius	
Cuban green woodpecker	Xiphidiopicus percussus	(E)
Northern flicker	Colaptes auratus chrysocaulosus	(Es)
Fernandina's flicker	Colaptes fernandinae	(E) vulnerable
Ivory-billed woodpecker	Campephilus principalis bairdii	(Es) (R) critically endangered (possibly extinct)
Pileated woodpecker	Dryocopus pileatus	(LC) (A)

== Falcons and caracaras ==
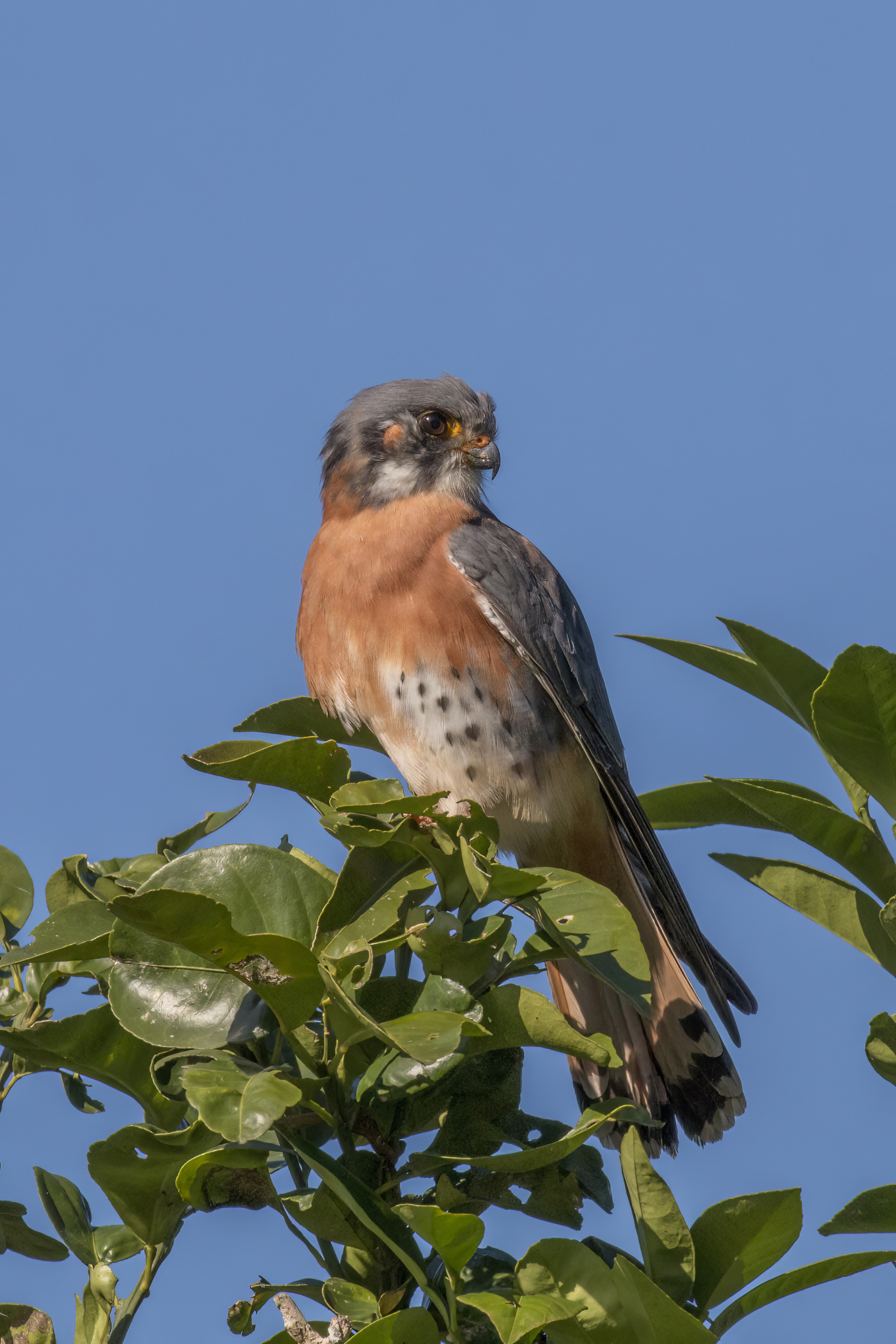
American kestrel, male red morph

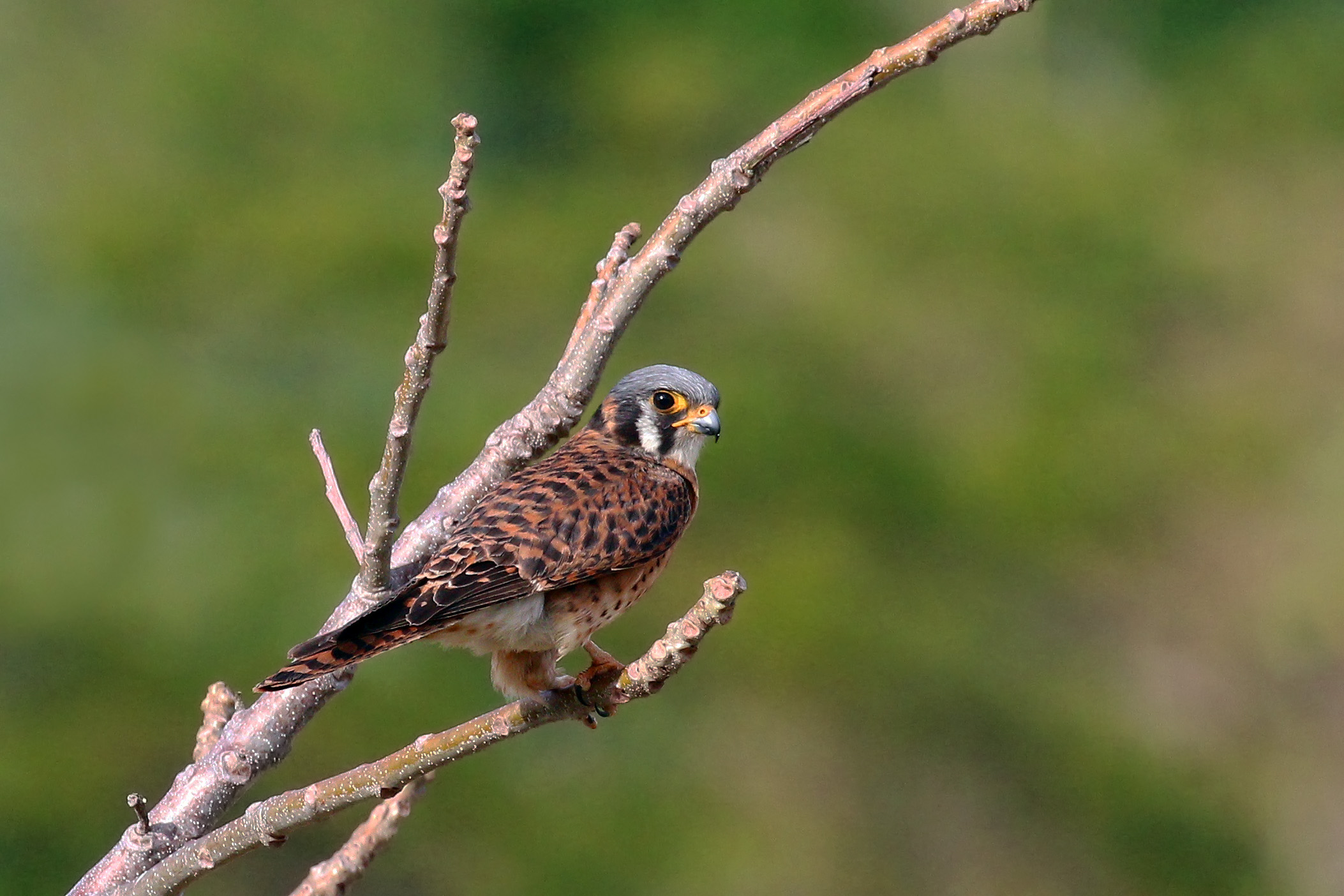
American kestrel, female white morph

Order: Falconiformes Family: Falconidae

Falconidae is a family of diurnal birds of prey. They differ from hawks, eagles, and kites in that they kill with their beaks instead of their talons.

Common name	Binomial	Status
Crested caracara	Caracara plancus	
American kestrel	Falco sparverius sparveroides	(Es)
Merlin	Falco columbarius	
Peregrine falcon	Falco peregrinus	

== New World and African parrots ==
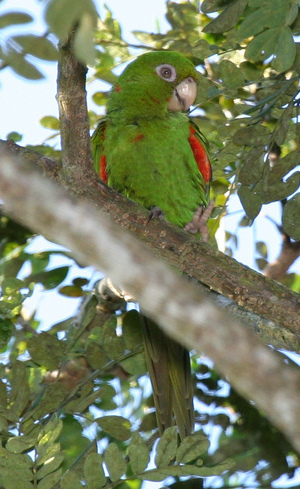
Cuban parakeet

Order: Psittaciformes Family: Psittacidae

Parrots are small to large birds with a characteristic curved beak. Their upper mandibles have slight mobility in the joint with the skull and they have a generally erect stance. All parrots are zygodactyl, having the four toes on each foot placed two at the front and two to the back.

Common name	Binomial	Status
Cuban macaw	Ara tricolor	extinct
Red-and-green macaw	Ara chloropterus	(I)
Blue-and-yellow macaw	Ara ararauna	(I)
Cuban parakeet	Psittacara euops	(E) vulnerable
Cuban parrot	Amazona leucocephala	near-threatened

== Tyrant flycatchers ==
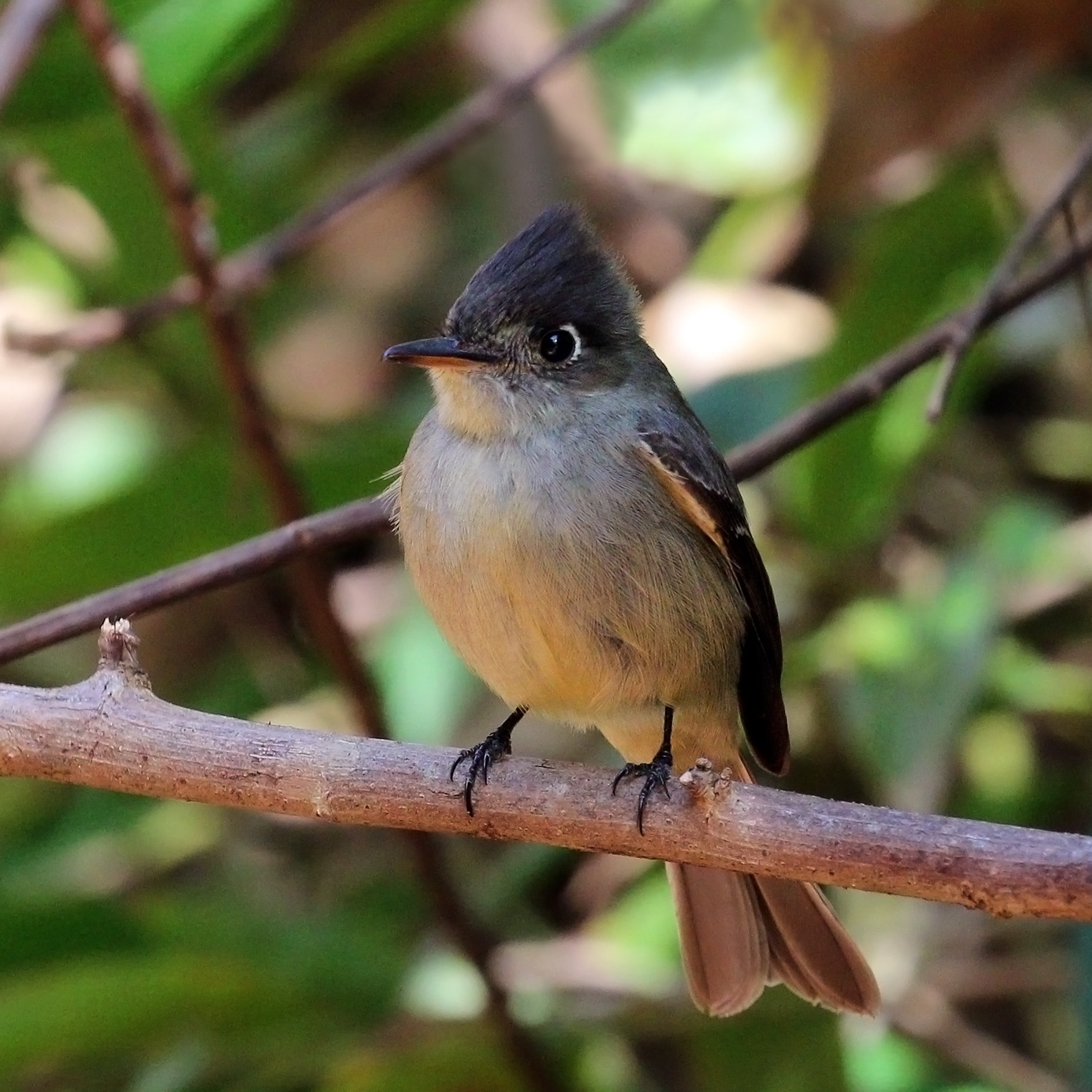
Cuban pewee

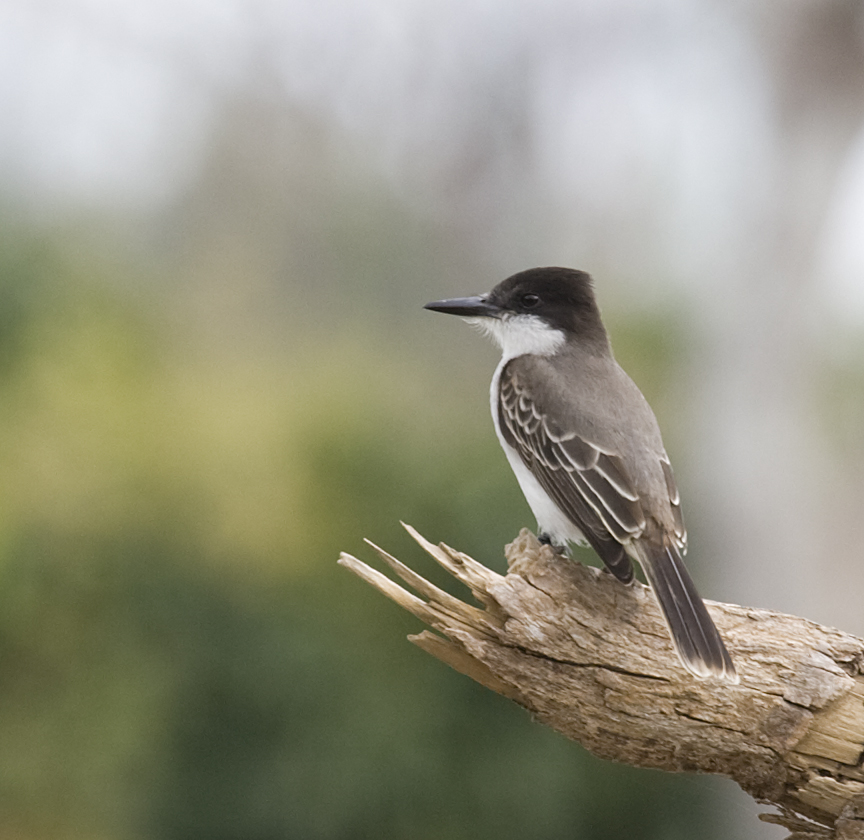
Loggerhead kingbird

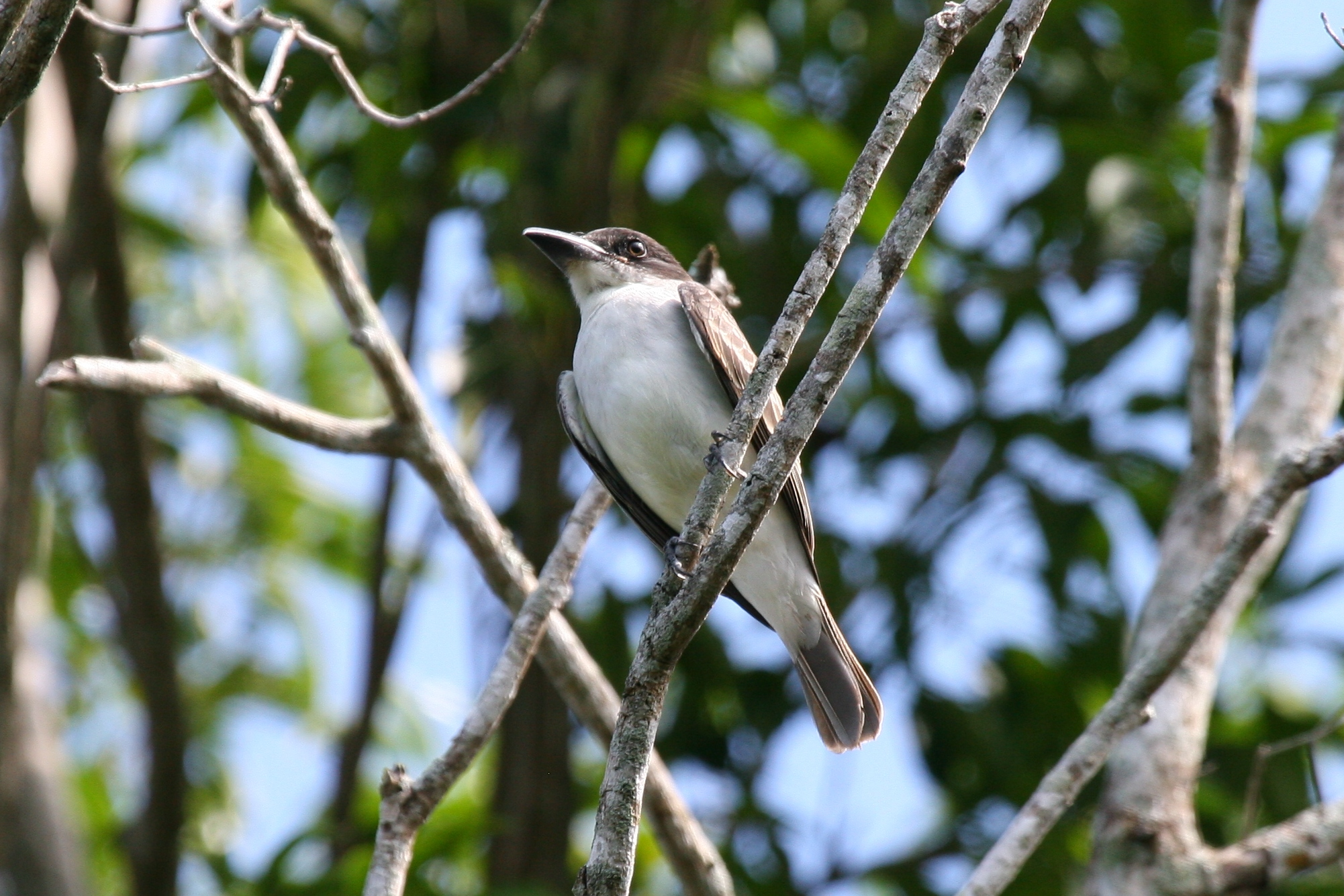
Giant kingbird

Order: Passeriformes Family: Tyrannidae

Tyrant flycatchers are passerine birds which occur throughout North and South America. They superficially resemble the Old World flycatchers, but are more robust and have stronger bills. They do not have the sophisticated vocal capabilities of the songbirds. Most, but not all, have plain coloring. As the name implies, most are insectivorous.

Common name	Binomial	Status
Great crested flycatcher	Myiarchus crinitus	(R)
La Sagra's flycatcher	Myiarchus sagrae	
Tropical kingbird	Tyrannus melancholicus	(R)
Cassin's kingbird	Tyrannus vociferans	(R)
Western kingbird	Tyrannus verticalis	(R)
Eastern kingbird	Tyrannus tyrannus	
Gray kingbird	Tyrannus dominicensis	
Loggerhead kingbird	Tyrannus caudifasciatus caudifasciatus	(Es)
Giant kingbird	Tyrannus cubensis	(E) endangered
Scissor-tailed flycatcher	Tyrannus forficatus	(R)
Fork-tailed flycatcher	Tyrannus savana	(R)
Western wood-pewee	Contopus sordidulus	(R)
Eastern wood-pewee	Contopus virens	
Cuban pewee	Contopus caribaeus	
Yellow-bellied flycatcher	Empidonax flaviventris	(R)
Acadian flycatcher	Empidonax virescens	
Alder flycatcher	Empidonax alnorum	(R)
Willow flycatcher	Empidonax traillii	
Least flycatcher	Empidonax minimus	(R)
Eastern phoebe	Sayornis phoebe	(R)
Vermilion flycatcher	Pyrocephalus rubinus	(R)

== Vireos, shrike-babblers, and erpornis ==
Order: Passeriformes Family: Vireonidae

The vireos are a group of small to medium-sized passerine birds. They are typically greenish in color and resemble New World warblers apart from their heavier bills.

Common name	Binomial	Status
White-eyed vireo	Vireo griseus	
Thick-billed vireo	Vireo crassirostris	vulnerable
Cuban vireo	Vireo gundlachii	(E)
Yellow-throated vireo	Vireo flavifrons	
Blue-headed vireo	Vireo solitarius	(R)
Philadelphia vireo	Vireo philadelphicus	(R)
Warbling vireo	Vireo gilvus	(R)
Red-eyed vireo	Vireo olivaceus	
Black-whiskered vireo	Vireo altiloquus	

== Crows, jays, and magpies ==
Order: Passeriformes Family: Corvidae

The family Corvidae includes crows, ravens, jays, choughs, magpies, treepies, nutcrackers, and ground jays. Corvids are above average in size among the Passeriformes, and some of the larger species show high levels of intelligence.

Common name	Binomial	Status
House crow	Corvus splendens	(R)
Cuban palm crow	Corvus minutus	
Cuban crow	Corvus nasicus	

== Swallows ==
Order: Passeriformes Family: Hirundinidae

The family Hirundinidae is adapted to aerial feeding. They have a slender streamlined body, long pointed wings, and a short bill with a wide gape. The feet are adapted to perching rather than walking, and the front toes are partially joined at the base.

Common name	Binomial	Status
Bank swallow	Riparia riparia	
Tree swallow	Tachycineta bicolor	
Bahama swallow	Tachycineta cyaneoviridis	(R)
Northern rough-winged swallow	Stelgidopteryx serripennis	
Purple martin	Progne subis	
Cuban martin	Progne cryptoleuca	
Caribbean martin	Progne dominicensis	(R)
Barn swallow	Hirundo rustica	
Cliff swallow	Petrochelidon pyrrhonota	
Cave swallow	Petrochelidon fulva cavicola	(Es)

== Kinglets ==
Order: Passeriformes Family: Regulidae

The kinglets, also called crests, are a small group of birds often included in the Old World warblers, but frequently given family status because they also resemble the titmice.

Common name	Binomial	Status
Ruby-crowned kinglet	Corthylio calendula	(R)

== Waxwings ==
Order: Passeriformes Family: Bombycillidae

The waxwings are a group of passerine birds with soft silky plumage and unique red tips to some of the wing feathers. In the Bohemian and cedar waxwings, these tips look like sealing wax and give the group its name. These are arboreal birds of northern forests. They live on insects in summer and berries in winter.

Common name	Binomial	Status
Cedar waxwing	Bombycilla cedrorum	

== Gnatcatchers ==
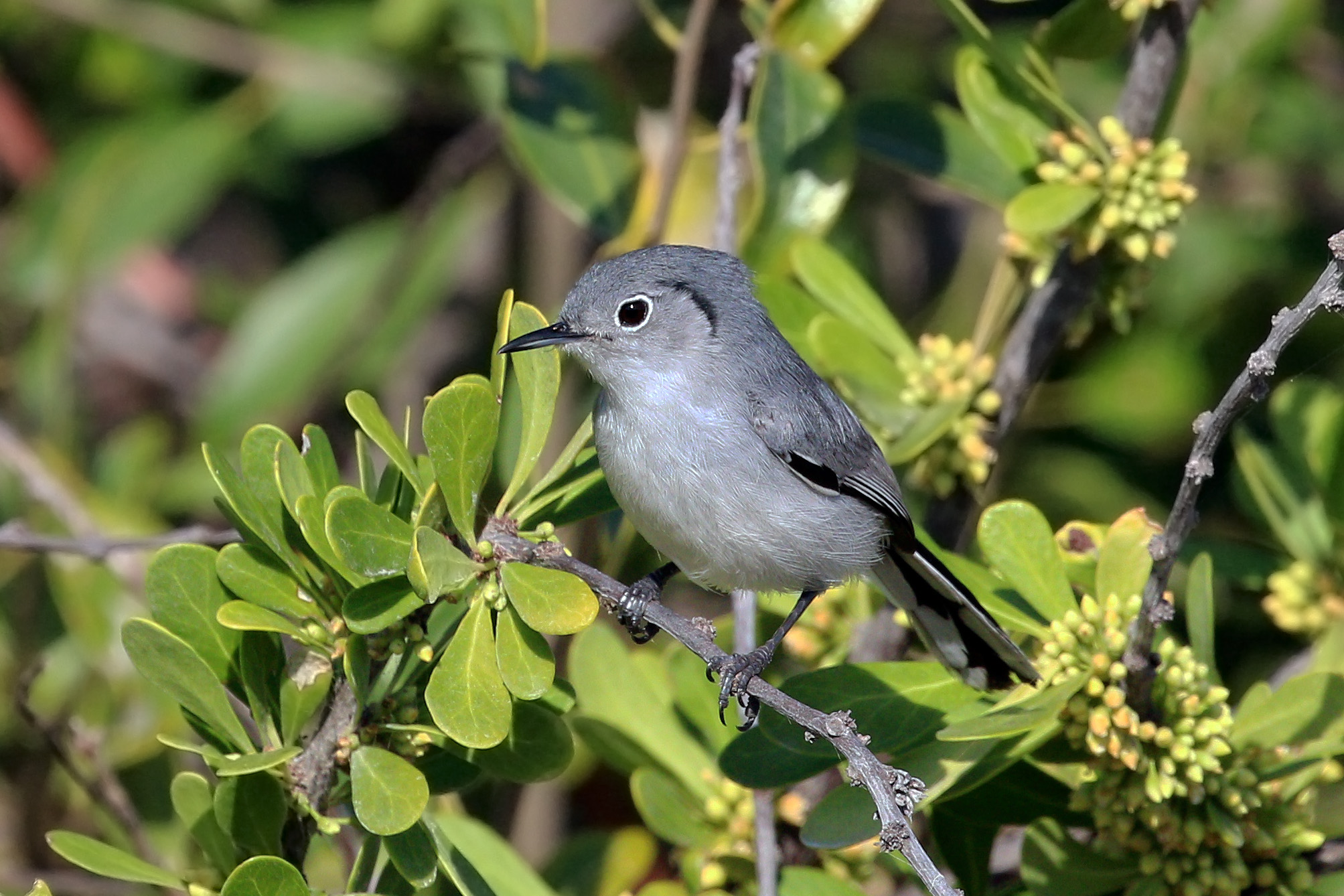
Cuban gnatcatcher

Order: Passeriformes Family: Polioptilidae

These dainty birds resemble Old World warblers in their build and habits, moving restlessly through the foliage seeking insects. The gnatcatchers and gnatwrens are mainly soft bluish gray in color and have the typical insectivore's long sharp bill. They are birds of fairly open woodland or scrub, which nest in bushes or trees.

Common name	Binomial	Status
Cuban gnatcatcher	Polioptila lembeyei	(E)
Blue-gray gnatcatcher	Polioptila caerulea	

== Wrens ==
Order: Passeriformes Family: Troglodytidae

The wrens are mainly small and inconspicuous except for their loud songs. These birds have short wings and thin down-turned bills. Several species often hold their tails upright. All are insectivorous.

Common name	Binomial	Status
Zapata wren	Ferminia cerverai	(E) endangered
House wren	Troglodytes aedon	(R)
Marsh wren	Cistothorus palustris	(H)

== Mockingbirds and thrashers ==
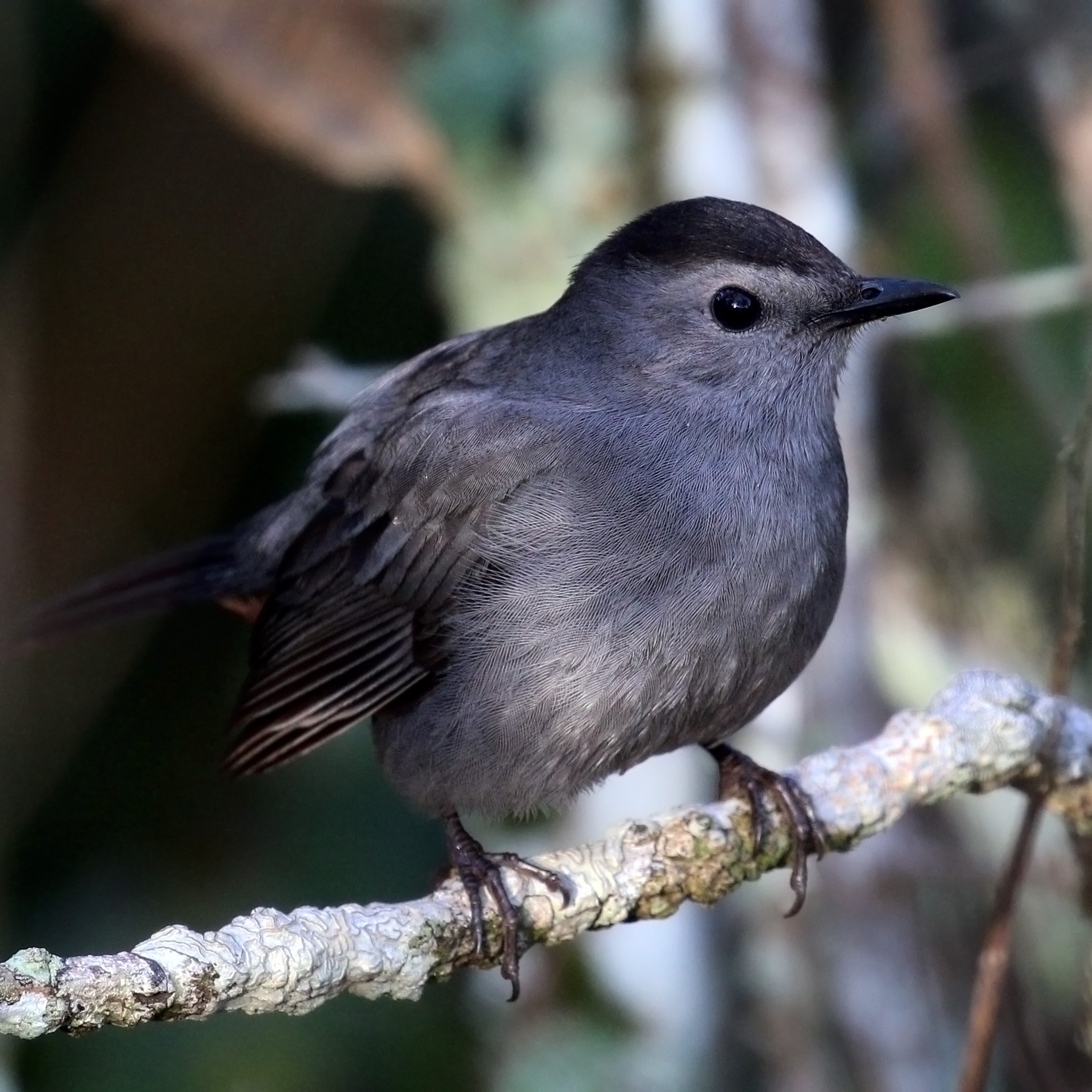
Gray catbird

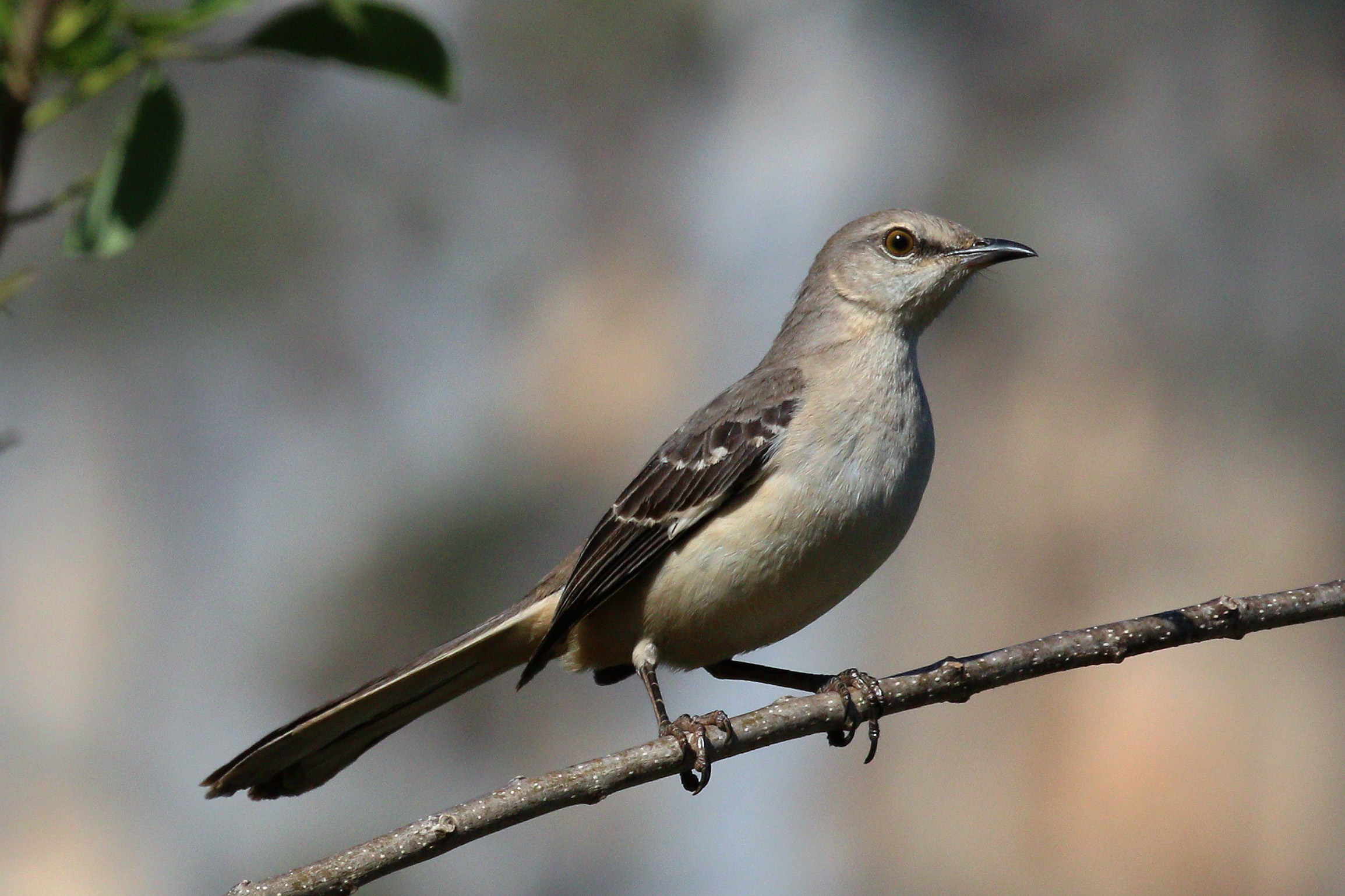
Northern mockingbird

Order: Passeriformes Family: Mimidae

The mimids are a family of passerine birds that includes thrashers, mockingbirds, tremblers, and the New World catbirds. These birds are notable for their vocalizations, especially their ability to mimic a wide variety of birds and other sounds heard outdoors. Their coloring tends towards dull-grays and browns.

Common name	Binomial	Status
Gray catbird	Dumetella carolinensis	
Brown thrasher	Toxostoma rufum	(R)
Bahama mockingbird	Mimus gundlachii	(R)
Northern mockingbird	Mimus polyglottos	

== Starlings ==
Order: Passeriformes Family: Sturnidae

Starlings are small to medium-sized passerine birds. Their flight is strong and direct and they are very gregarious. Their preferred habitat is fairly open country. They eat insects and fruit. Plumage is typically dark with a metallic sheen.

Common name	Binomial	Status
European starling	Sturnus vulgaris	(I) (R)
Common myna	Acridotheres tristis	(I) (R)

== Thrushes and allies ==
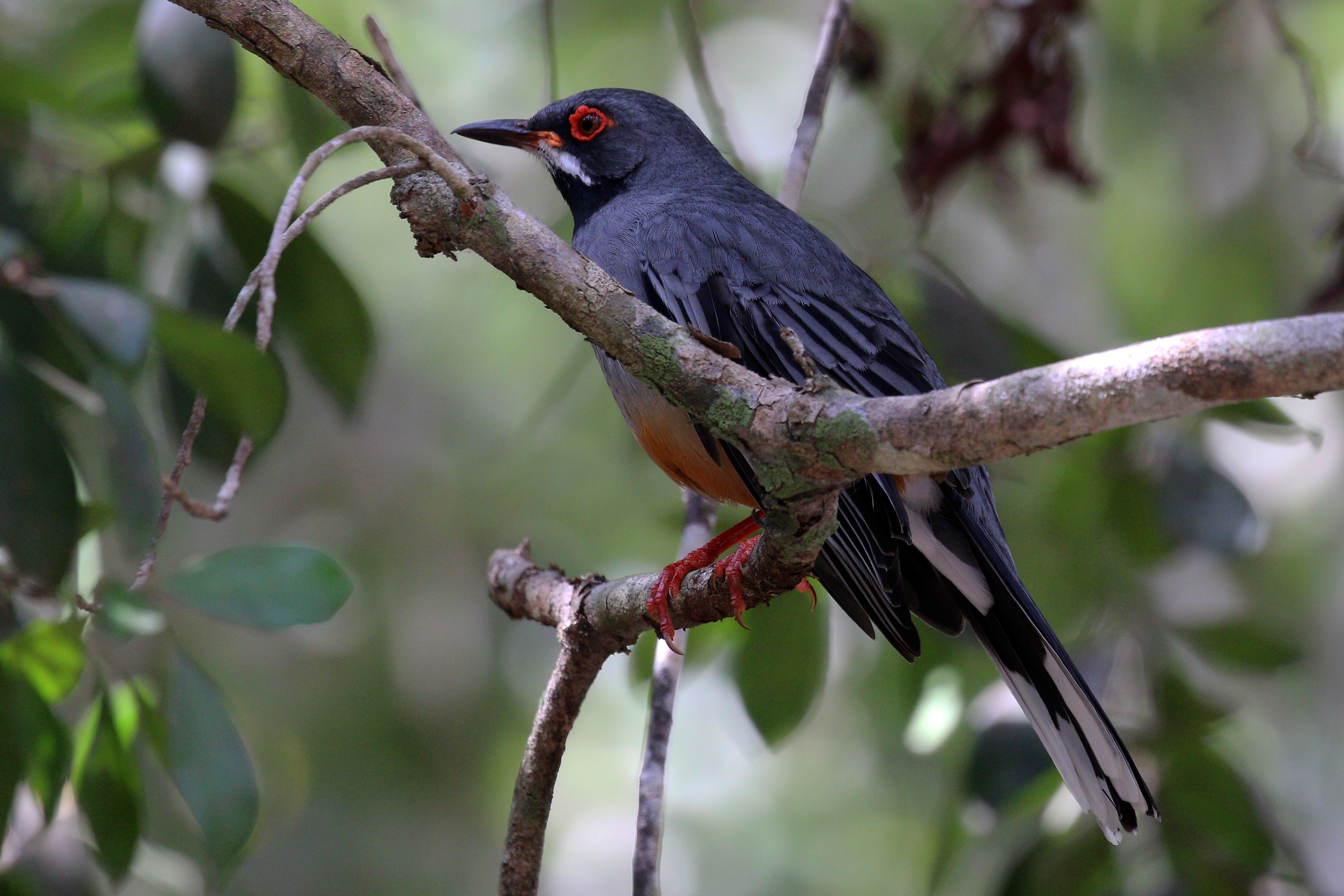
Western red-legged thrush

Order: Passeriformes Family: Turdidae

The thrushes are a group of passerine birds that occur mainly in the Old World. They are plump, soft-plumaged, small to medium-sized insectivores or sometimes omnivores, often feeding on the ground. Many have attractive songs.

Common name	Binomial	Status
Eastern bluebird	Sialia sialis	(R)
Cuban solitaire	Myadestes elisabeth	(E) near-threatened
Veery	Catharus fuscescens	(R)
Gray-cheeked thrush	Catharus minimus	
Bicknell's thrush	Catharus bicknelli	vulnerable
Swainson's thrush	Catharus ustulatus	
Hermit thrush	Catharus guttatus	(R)
Wood thrush	Hylocichla mustelina	(R)
American robin	Turdus migratorius	(R)
Western red-legged thrush	Turdus plumbeus	

== Old World flycatchers ==
Order: Passeriformes Family: Muscicapidae

Old World flycatchers are a large group of small passerine birds native to the Old World. They are mainly small arboreal insectivores. The appearance of these birds is highly varied, but they mostly have weak songs and harsh calls.

Common name	Binomial	Status
Northern wheatear	Oenanthe oenanthe	(R)

== Waxbills and allies ==
Order: Passeriformes Family: Estrildidae

The estrildid finches are small passerine birds of the Old World tropics and Australasia. They are gregarious and often colonial seed eaters with short thick but pointed bills. They are all similar in build and habits, but have wide variation in plumage colors and patterns.

Common name	Binomial	Status
Scaly-breasted munia	Lonchura punctulata	(I)
Tricolored munia	Lonchura malacca	(I)
Chestnut munia	Lonchura atricapilla	(I) (R)

== Old World sparrows ==
Order: Passeriformes Family: Passeridae

Sparrows are small passerine birds. In general, sparrows tend to be small, plump, brown or gray birds with short tails and short powerful beaks. Sparrows are seed eaters, but they also consume small insects.

Common name	Binomial	Status
House sparrow	Passer domesticus	(I)

== Wagtails and pipits ==
Order: Passeriformes Family: Motacillidae

Motacillidae is a family of small passerine birds with medium to long tails. They include the wagtails, longclaws, and pipits. They are slender ground-feeding insectivores of open country.

Common name	Binomial	Status
White wagtail	Motacilla alba	(R)
American pipit	Anthus rubescens	(R)

== Finches, euphonias, and allies ==
Order: Passeriformes Family: Fringillidae

Finches are seed-eating passerine birds that are small to moderately large and have a strong beak, usually conical and in some species very large. All have twelve tail feathers and nine primaries. These birds have a bouncing flight with alternating bouts of flapping and gliding on closed wings, and most sing well.

Common name	Binomial	Status
House finch	Haemorhous mexicanus	(I) (VR)
American goldfinch	Spinus tristis	(R)

== Longspurs and snow buntings ==
Order: Passeriformes Family: Calcariidae

The Calcariidae are a group of passerine birds that had been traditionally grouped with the New World sparrows, but differ in a number of respects and are usually found in open grassy areas.

Common name	Binomial	Status
Lapland longspur	Calcarius lapponicus	(R)

== New World sparrows ==
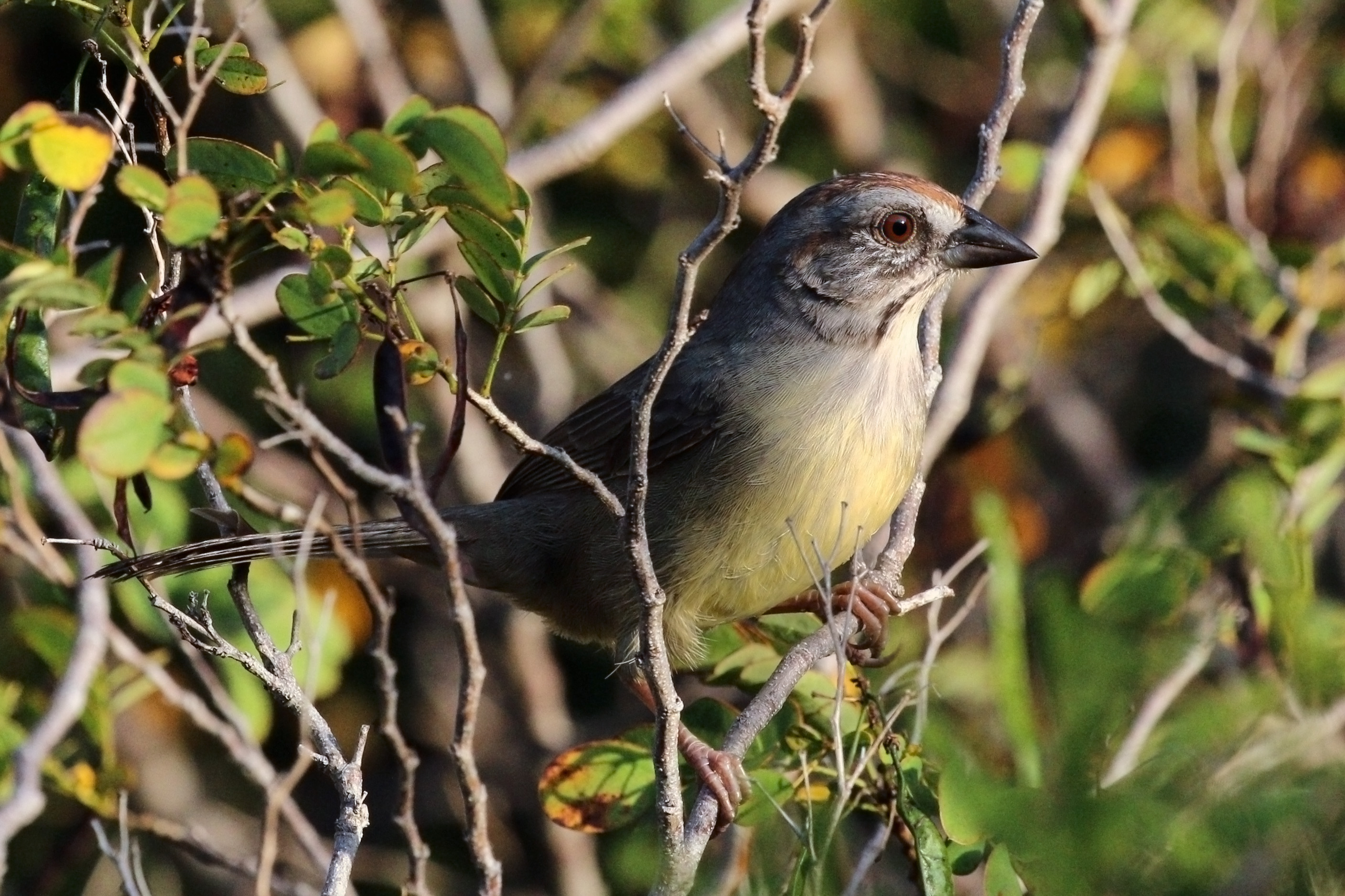
Zapata sparrow

Order: Passeriformes Family: Passerellidae

Until 2017, these species were considered part of the family Emberizidae. Most of the species are known as sparrows, but these birds are not closely related to the Old World sparrows which are in the family Passeridae. Many of these have distinctive head patterns.

Common name	Binomial	Status
Grasshopper sparrow	Ammodramus savannarum	
Lark sparrow	Chondestes grammacus	(R)
Chipping sparrow	Spizella passerina	(R)
Clay-colored sparrow	Spizella pallida	(R)
Dark-eyed junco	Junco hyemalis	(R)
White-crowned sparrow	Zonotrichia leucophrys	
Harris's sparrow	Zonotrichia querula	(R)
White-throated sparrow	Zonotrichia albicollis	(R)
Savannah sparrow	Passerculus sandwichensis	
Song sparrow	Melospiza melodia	(R)
Lincoln's sparrow	Melospiza lincolnii	(R)
Zapata sparrow	Torreornis inexpectata	(E) endangered
Green-tailed towhee	Pipilo chlorurus	(R)

== Spindalises ==
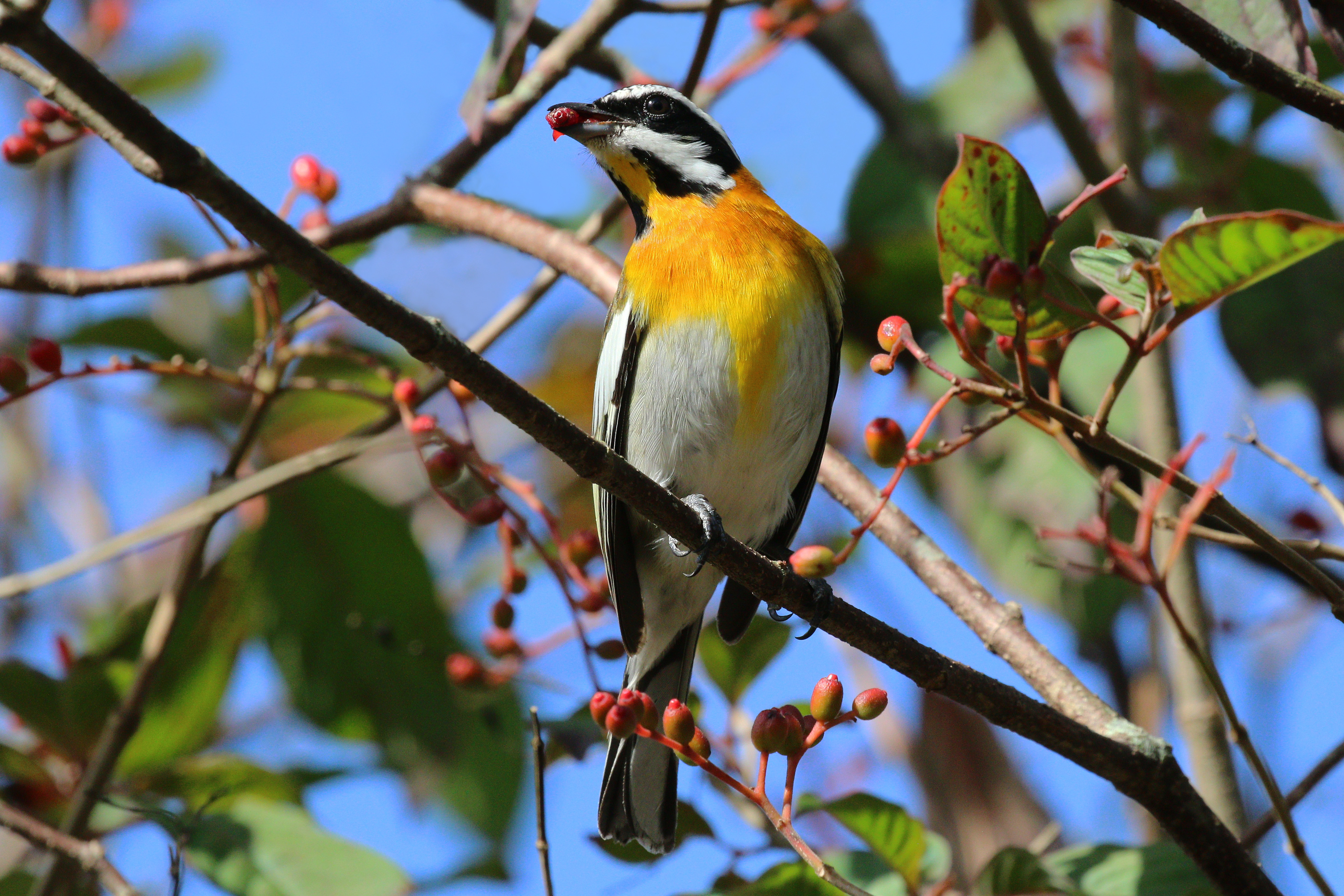
Western spindalis

Order: Passeriformes Family: Spindalidae

The members of this small family are native to the Greater Antilles. They were formerly classified as tanagers (family Thraupidae) but were placed in their own family in 2017.

Common name	Binomial	Status
Western spindalis	Spindalis zena pretrei	(Es)

== Cuban warblers ==
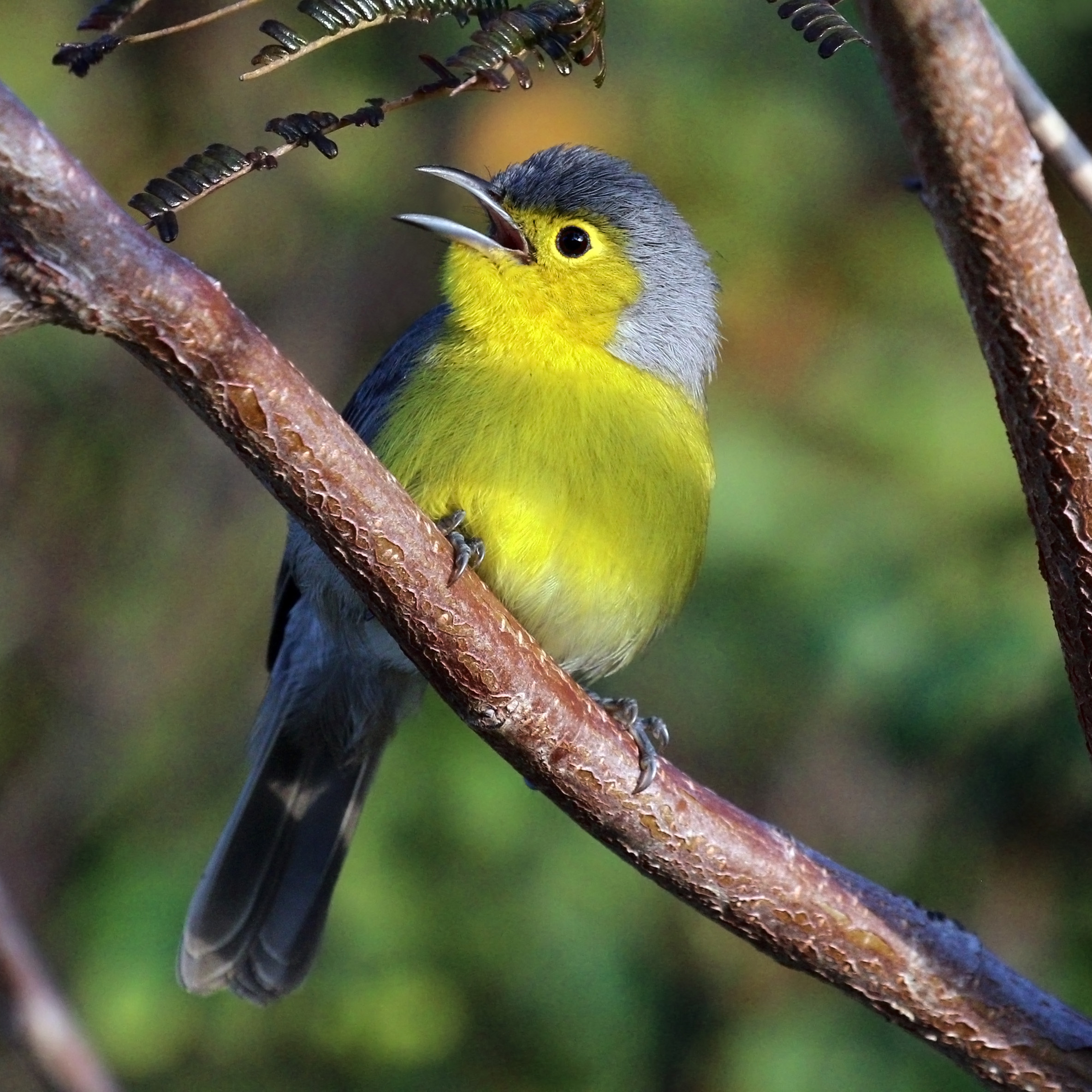
Oriente warbler

Order: Passeriformes Family: Teretistridae

These two species were formerly placed in the New World warblers (Parulidae) but were moved to their own family in 2017.

Common name	Binomial	Status
Yellow-headed warbler	Teretistris fernandinae	(E)
Oriente warbler	Teretistris fornsi	(E)

== Yellow-breasted chat ==
Order: Passeriformes Family: Icteriidae

This species was historically placed in the New World warblers, but nonetheless most authorities were unsure if it belonged there. It was moved to its own family in 2017.

Common name	Binomial	Status
Yellow-breasted chat	Icteria virens	(R)

== Troupials and allies ==
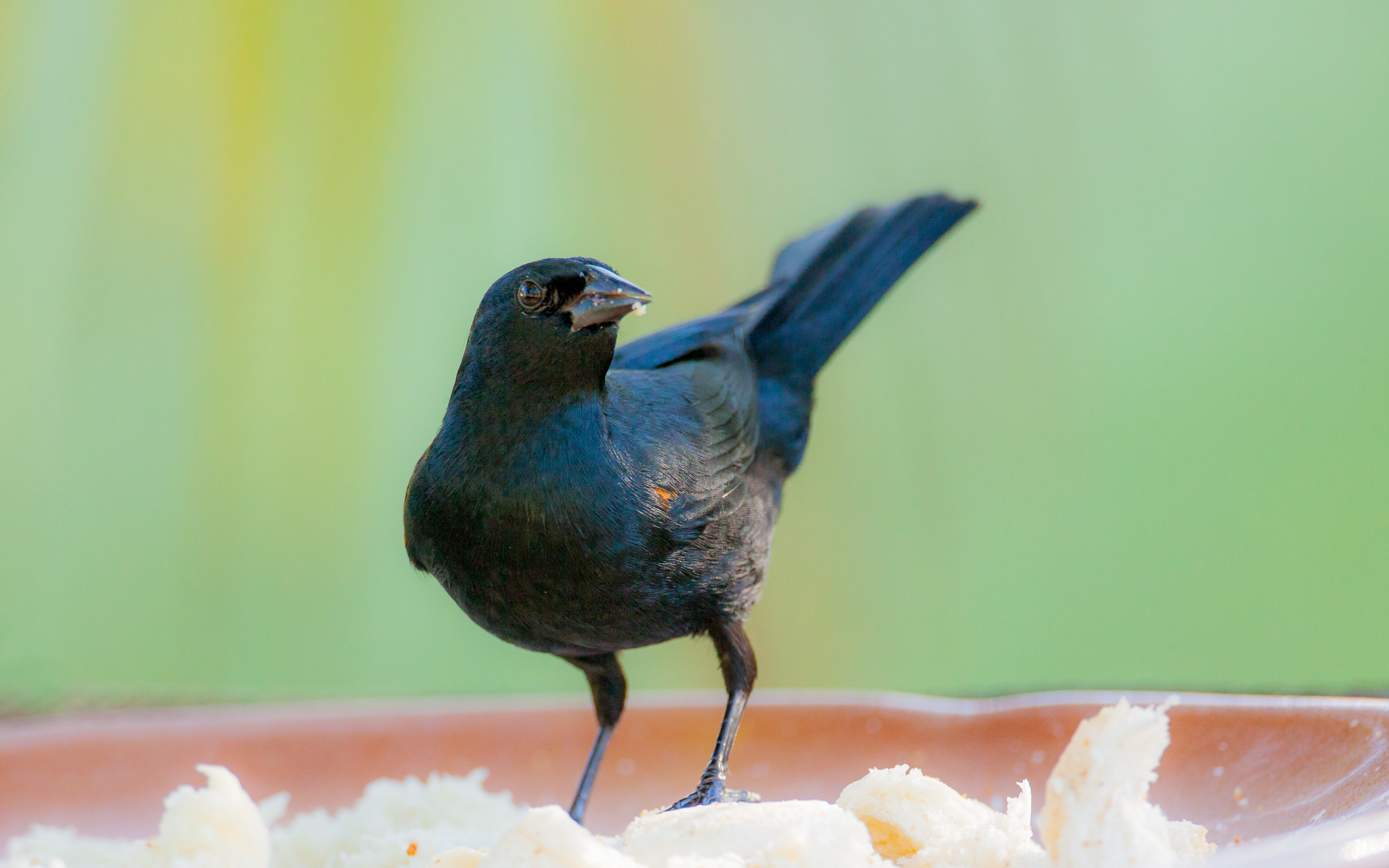
Tawny-shouldered blackbird

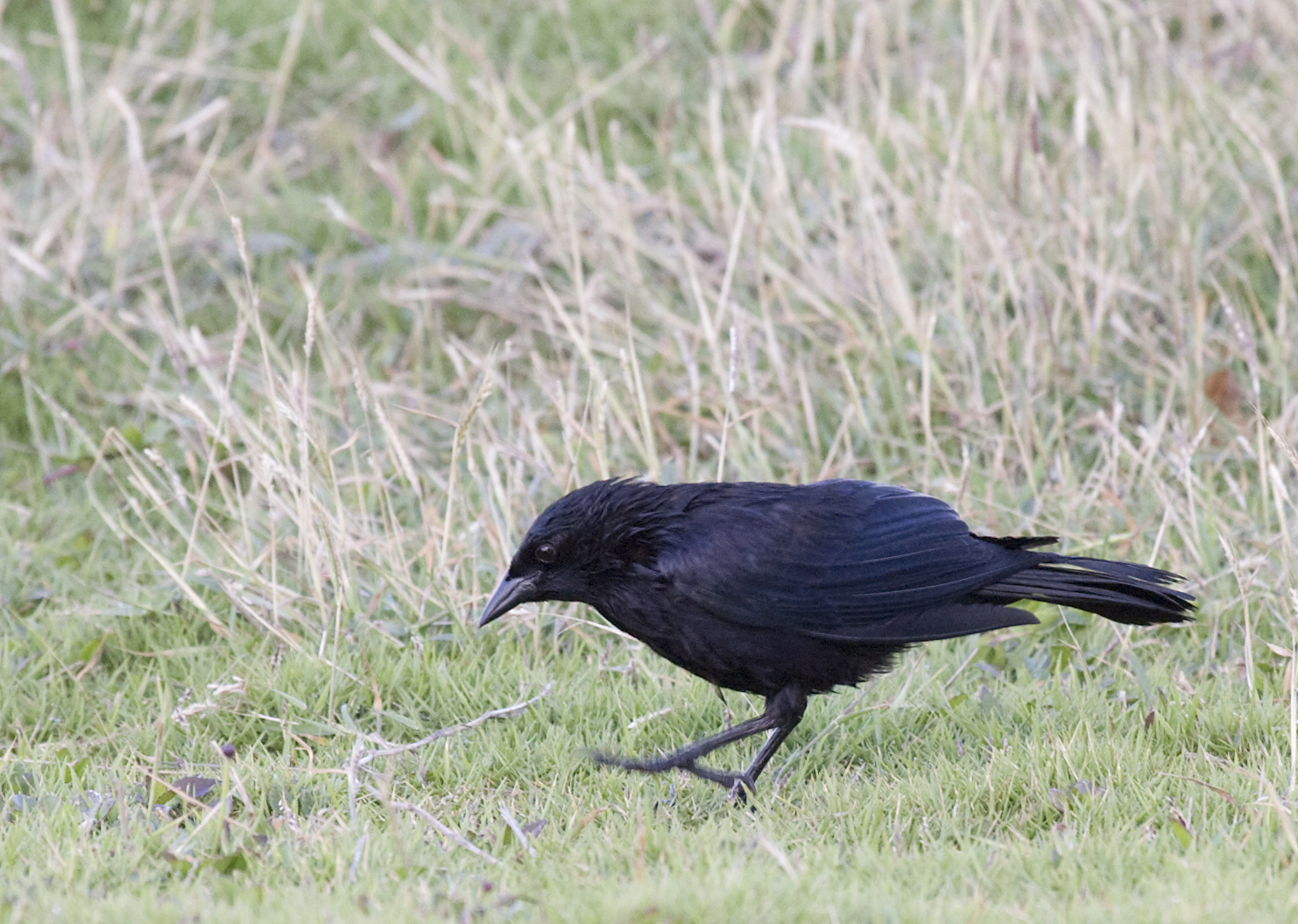
Cuban blackbird

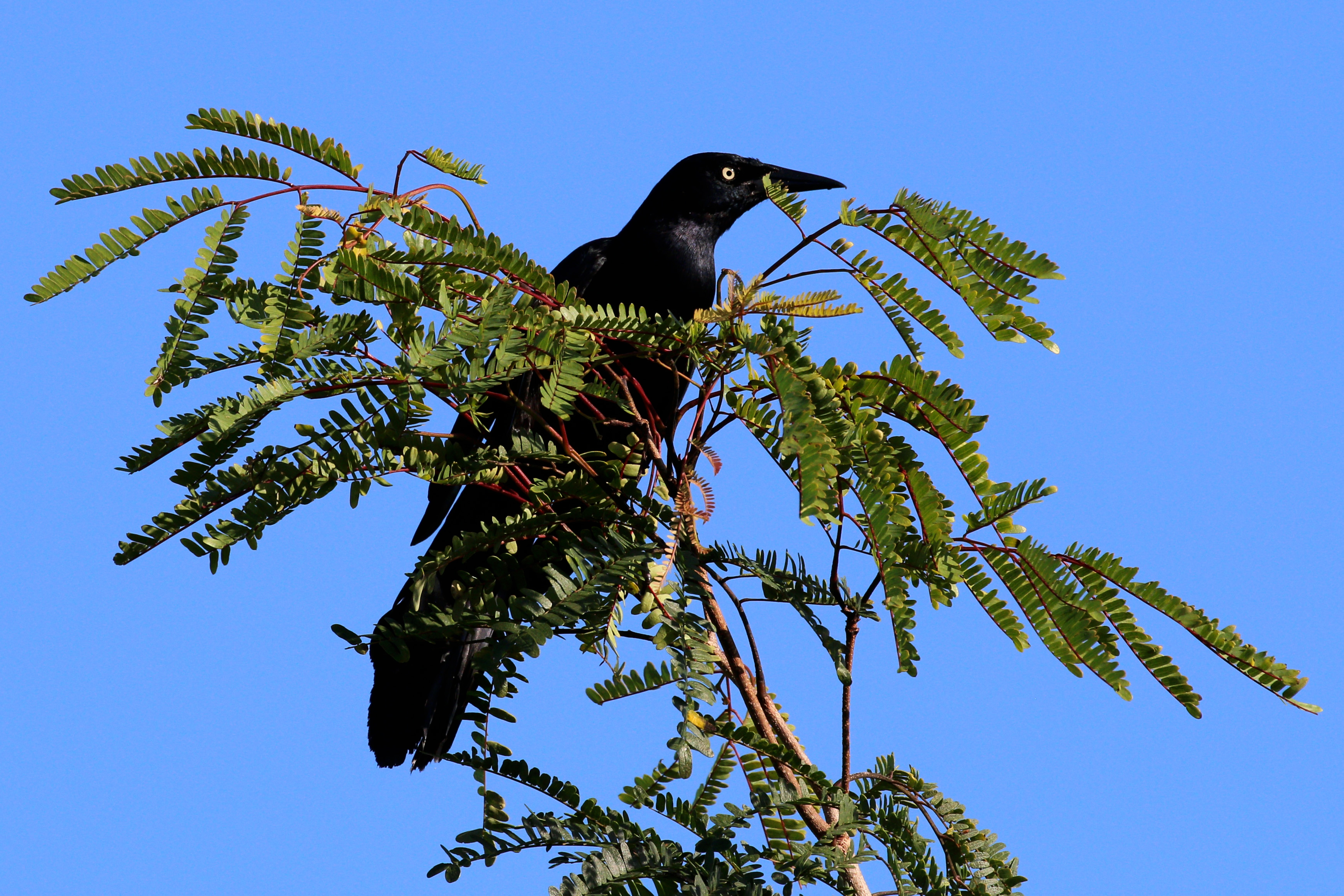
Greater Antillean grackle

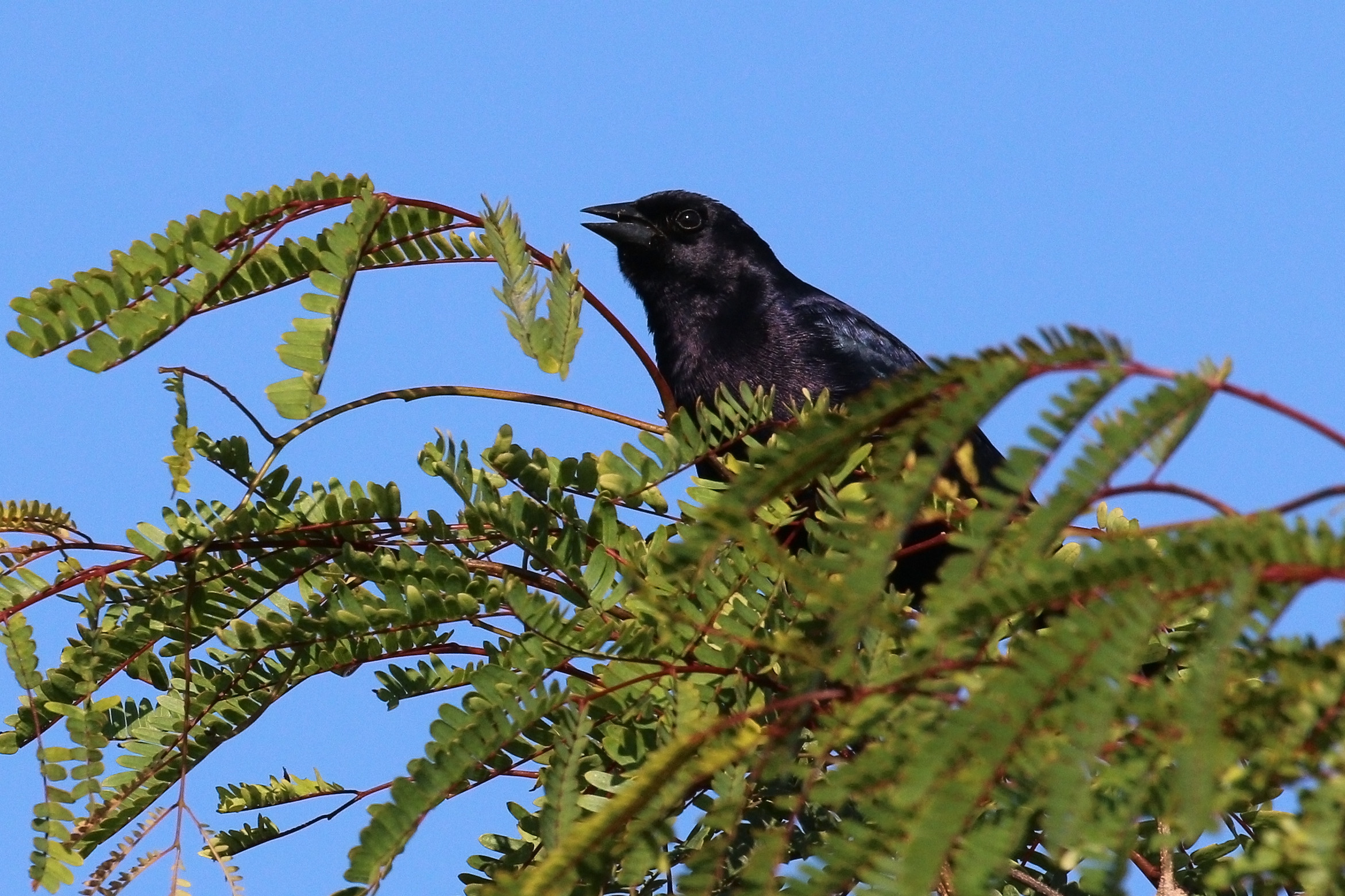
Shiny cowbird

Order: Passeriformes Family: Icteridae

The icterids are a group of small to medium-sized, often colorful, passerine birds restricted to the New World and include the grackles, New World blackbirds, and New World orioles. Most species have black as the predominant plumage color, often enlivened by yellow, orange, or red.

Common name	Binomial	Status
Yellow-headed blackbird	Xanthocephalus xanthocephalus	(R)
Bobolink	Dolichonyx oryzivorus	
Eastern meadowlark	Sturnella magna hippocrepis	(Es)
Cuban oriole	Icterus melanopsis	(E)
Orchard oriole	Icterus spurius	
Hooded oriole	Icterus cucullatus	(R)
Yellow-tailed oriole	Icterus mesomelas	(H)
Altamira oriole	Icterus gularis	(R)
Baltimore oriole	Icterus galbula	
Red winged blackbird	Agealaius phoeniceus	
Red-shouldered blackbird	Agelaius assimilis	(E)
Tawny-shouldered blackbird	Agelaius humeralis	
Shiny cowbird	Molothrus bonariensis	
Brown-headed cowbird	Molothrus ater	(R)
Cuban blackbird	Ptiloxena atroviolacea	(E)
Rusty blackbird	Euphagus carolinus	(H)
Boat-tailed grackle	Quiscalus major	(R)
Great-tailed grackle	Quiscalus mexicanus	(R)
Greater Antillean grackle	Quiscalus niger	

== New World warblers ==
Order: Passeriformes Family: Parulidae

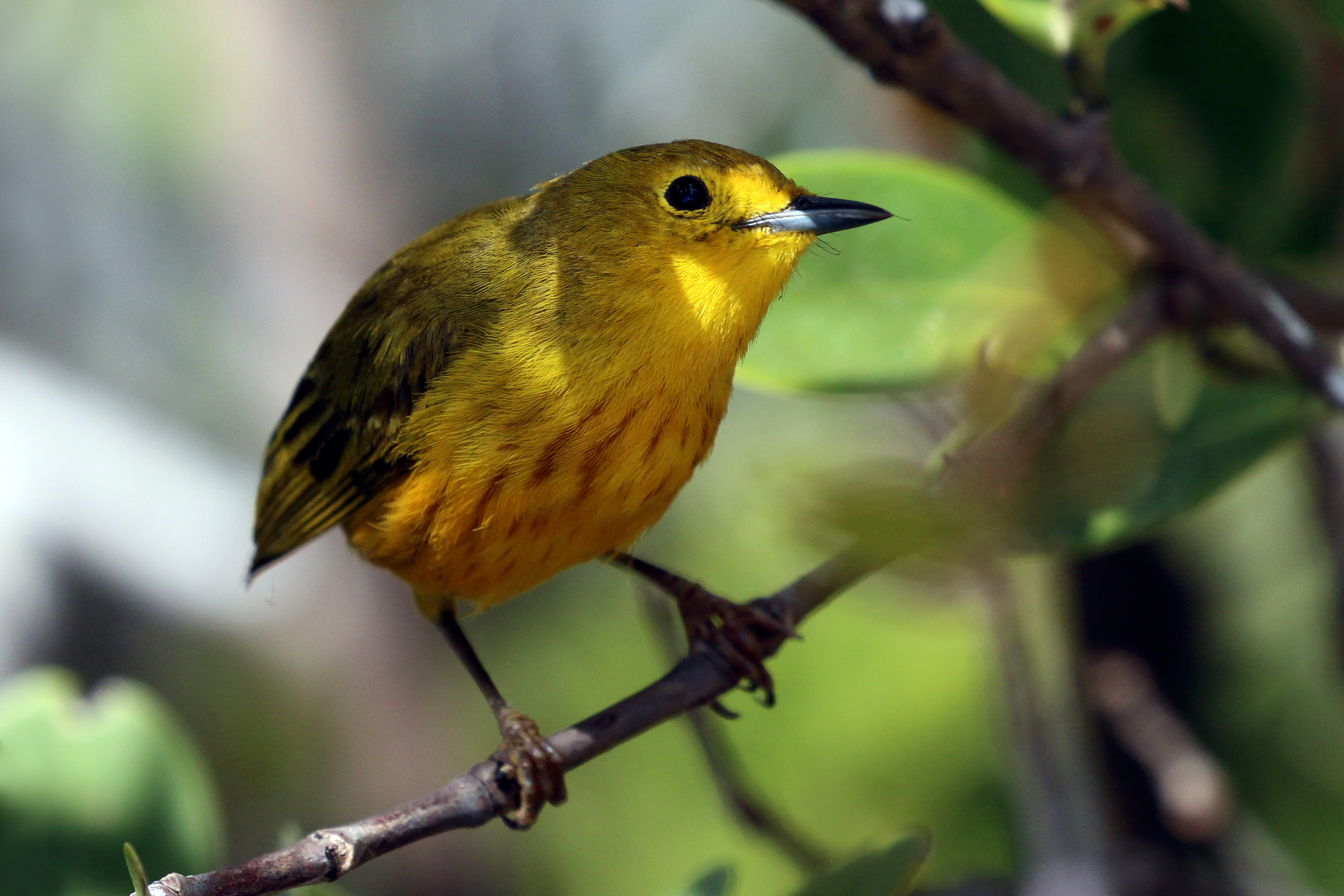
Yellow warbler

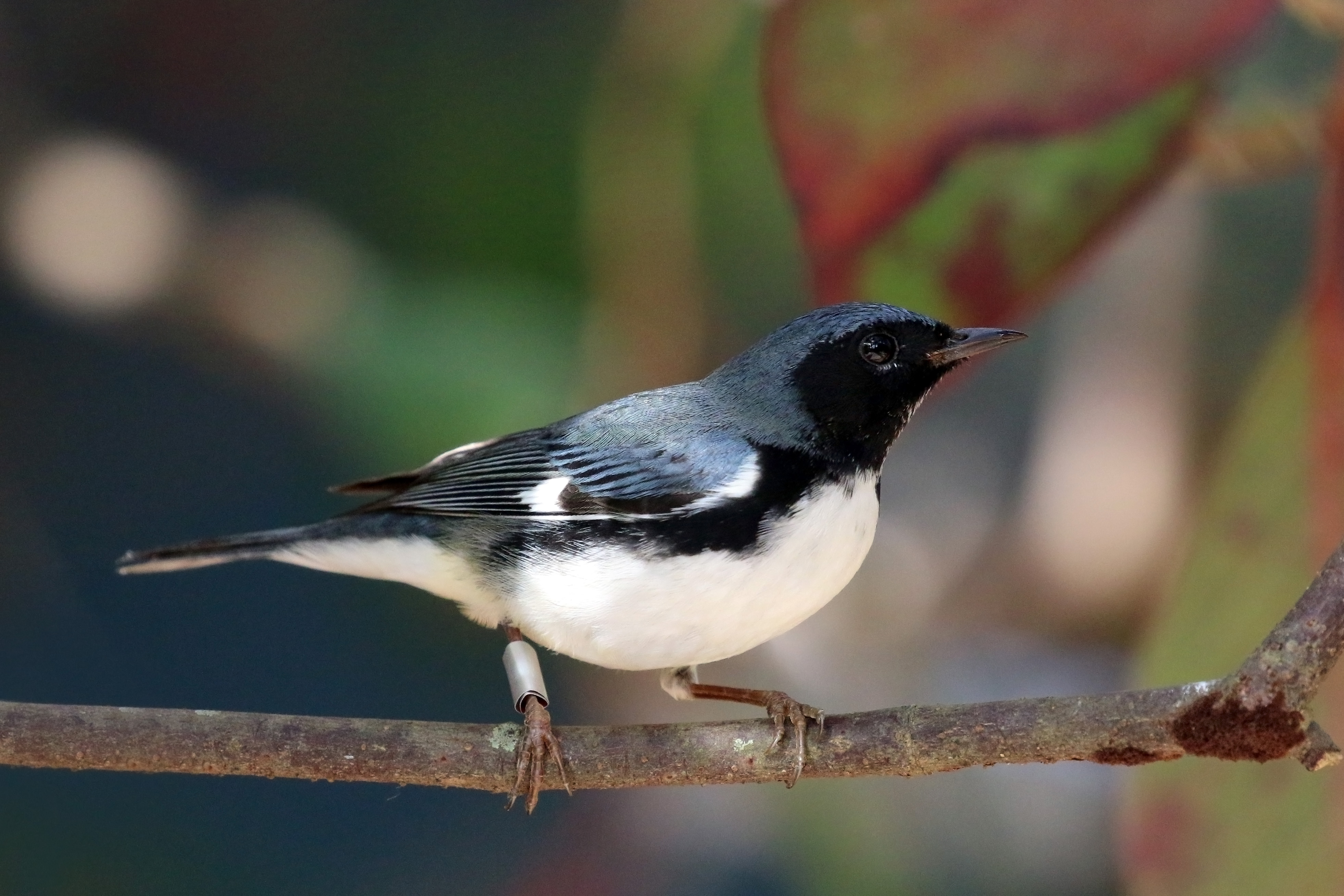
Black-throated blue warbler

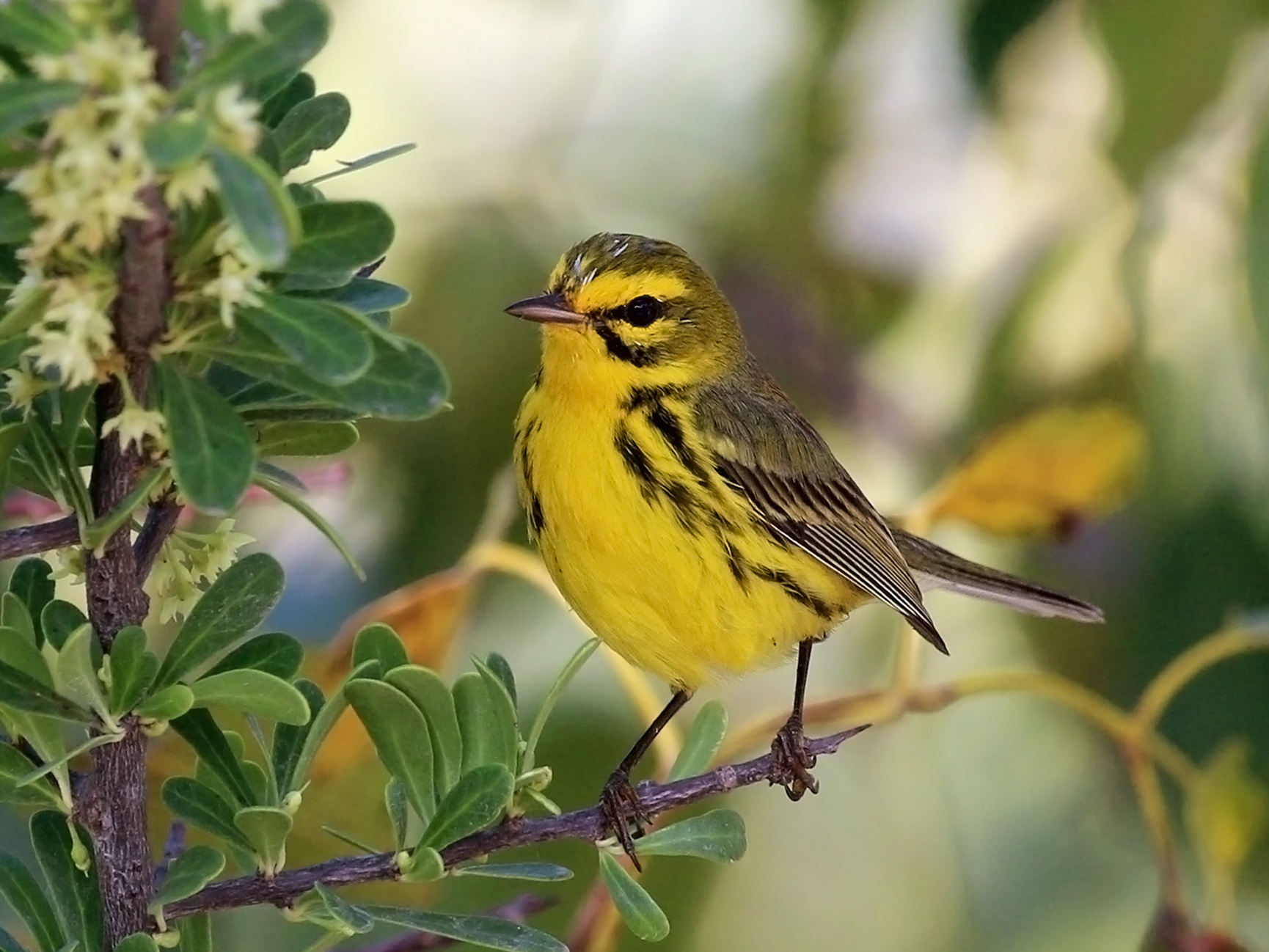
Prairie warbler

The New World warblers are a group of small, often colorful, passerine birds restricted to the New World. Most are arboreal, but some are terrestrial. Most members of this family are insectivores.

Common name	Binomial	Status
Ovenbird	Seiurus aurocapilla	
Worm-eating warbler	Helmitheros vermivorum	
Louisiana waterthrush	Parkesia motacilla	
Northern waterthrush	Parkesia noveboracensis	
Bachman's warbler	Vermivora bachmanii	critically endangered (possibly extinct)
Golden-winged warbler	Vermivora chrysoptera	(R) Near-threatened
Blue-winged warbler	Vermivora cyanoptera	(R)
Black-and-white warbler	Mniotilta varia	
Prothonotary warbler	Protonotaria citrea	
Swainson's warbler	Limnothlypis swainsonii	
Tennessee warbler	Leiothlypis peregrina	
Orange-crowned warbler	Leiothlypis celata	(R)
Nashville warbler	Leiothlypis ruficapilla	(R)
Virginia's warbler	Leiothlypis virginiae	(R)
Connecticut warbler	Oporornis agilis	(R)
Mourning warbler	Geothlypis philadelphia	(R)
Kentucky warbler	Geothlypis formosa	(R)
Common yellowthroat	Geothlypis trichas	
Hooded warbler	Setophaga citrina	
American redstart	Setophaga ruticilla	
Kirtland's warbler	Setophaga kirtlandii	(R) near-threatened
Cape May warbler	Setophaga tigrina	
Cerulean warbler	Setophaga cerulea	(R) Vulnerable
Northern parula	Setophaga americana	
Magnolia warbler	Setophaga magnolia	
Bay-breasted warbler	Setophaga castanea	(R)
Blackburnian warbler	Setophaga fusca	(R)
Yellow warbler	Setophaga petechia	
Chestnut-sided warbler	Setophaga pensylvanica	
Blackpoll warbler	Setophaga striata	
Black-throated blue warbler	Setophaga caerulescens	
Palm warbler	Setophaga palmarum	
Olive-capped warbler	Setophaga pityophila	
Pine warbler	Setophaga pinus	(R)
Yellow-rumped warbler	Setophaga coronata	
Yellow-throated warbler	Setophaga dominica	
Prairie warbler	Setophaga discolor	
Black-throated gray warbler	Setophaga nigrescens	(R)
Townsend's warbler	Setophaga townsendi	(R)
Black-throated green warbler	Setophaga virens	
Canada warbler	Cardellina canadensis	
Wilson's warbler	Cardellina pusilla	(R)

== Cardinals and allies ==
Order: Passeriformes Family: Cardinalidae

The cardinals are a family of robust, seed-eating birds with strong bills. They are typically associated with open woodland. The sexes usually have distinct plumages.

Common name	Binomial	Status
Summer tanager	Piranga rubra	
Scarlet tanager	Piranga olivacea	
Western tanager	Piranga ludoviciana	(R)
Black-headed grosbeak	Pheucticus ludovicianus	
Rose-breasted grosbeak	Pheucticus melanocephalus	(R)
Blue grosbeak	Passerina caerulea	
Lazuli bunting	Passerina amoena	(R)
Indigo bunting	Passerina cyanea	
Painted bunting	Passerina ciris	near-threatened
Dickcissel	Spiza americana	(R)

== Tanagers and allies ==
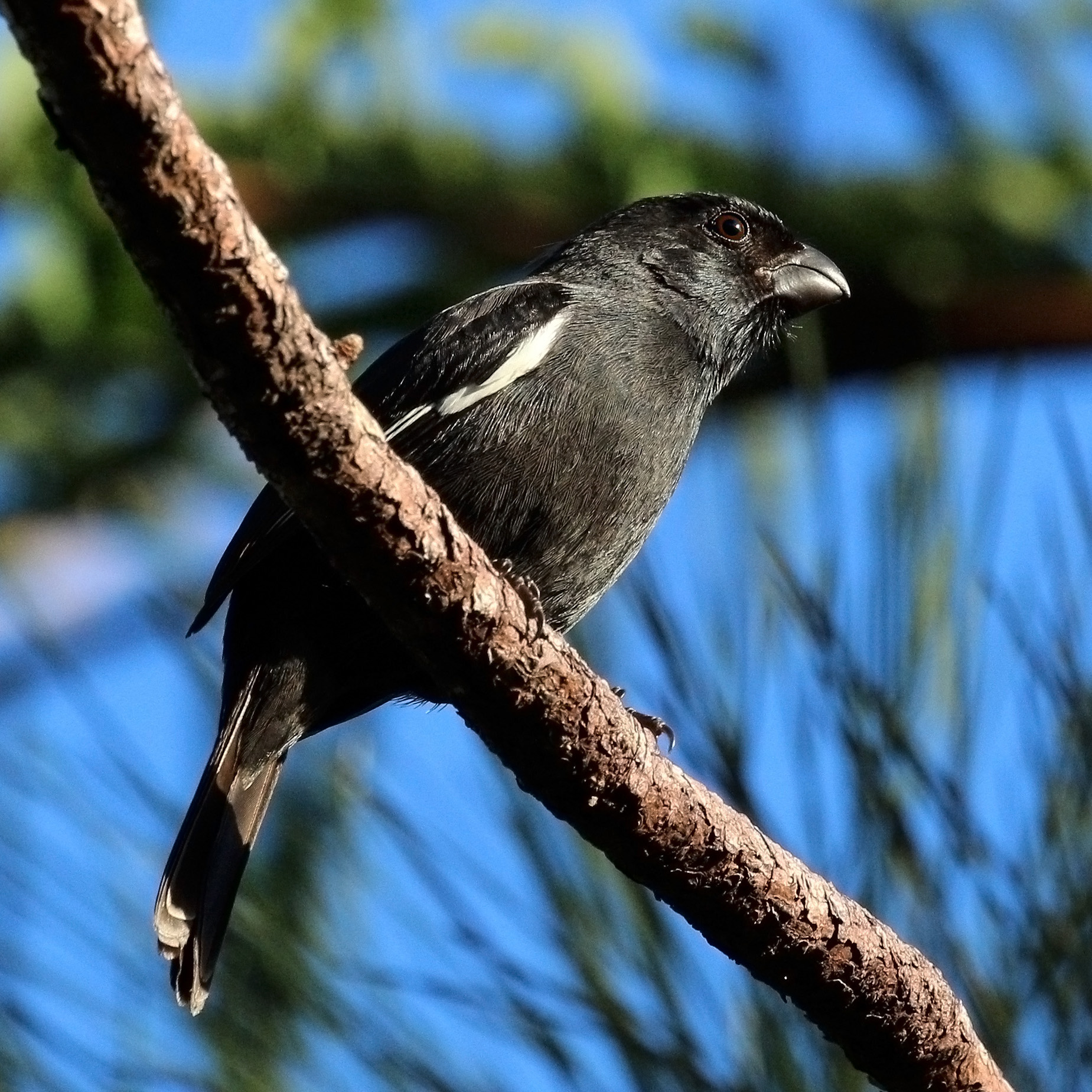
Cuban bullfinch

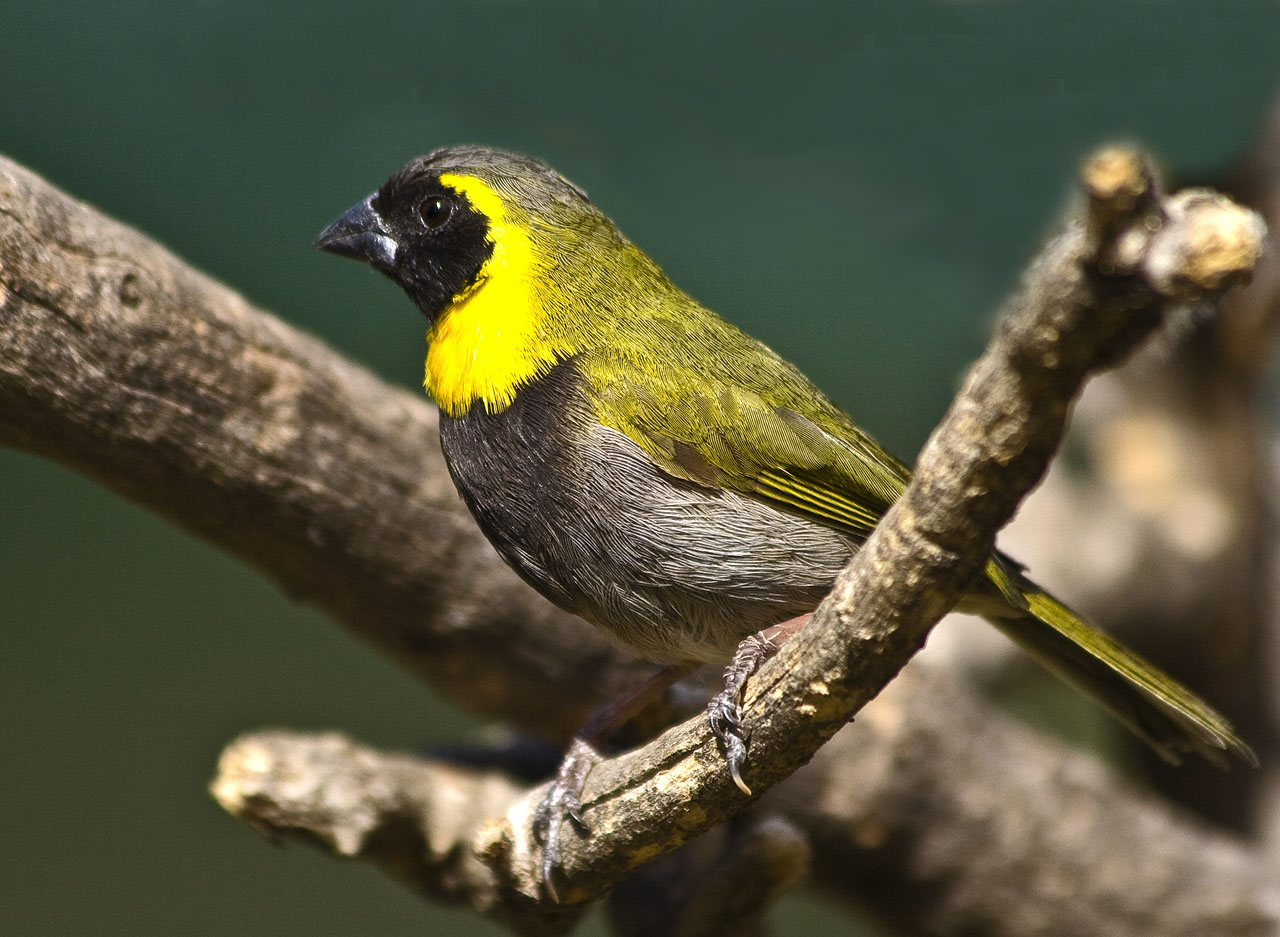
Cuban grassquit

Order: Passeriformes Family: Thraupidae

The tanagers are a large group of small to medium-sized passerine birds restricted to the New World, mainly in the tropics. Many species are brightly colored. As a family they are omnivorous, but individual species specialize in eating fruits, seeds, insects, or other types of food. Most have short, rounded wings.

Common name	Binomial	Status
Saffron finch	Sicalis flaveola	(R)
Blue-black grassquit	Volatinia jacarina	(R)
Red-legged honeycreeper	Cyanerpes cyaneus	
Bananaquit	Coereba flaveola	(R)
Yellow-faced grassquit	Tiaris olivaceus	
Cuban bullfinch	Melopyrrha nigra	(Es)
Cuban grassquit	Phonipara canora	(E)
Black-faced grassquit	Melanospiza bicolor	(R)

== See also ==
- List of birds
- Lists of birds by region
