= Zapata (disambiguation) =

Emiliano Zapata (1879–1919) was a Mexican revolutionary. It may also refer to:

== People ==
- Zapata (surname)

== Birds ==
- Zapata rail
- Zapata sparrow
- Zapata wren

== Places ==
- Ciénaga de Zapata, municipality in Cuba
  - Zapata Peninsula, peninsula in Cuba
  - Zapata Swamp, Cuba
- Zapata County, Texas
- Zapata, Texas

== Films ==
- Viva Zapata!, a 1952 movie based on the life of Emiliano Zapata
- Zapata: The Dream of a Hero, a Mexican movie about Emiliano Zapata
- Zapata Western, a subgenre of Westerns and Spaghetti Westerns set during the Mexican Revolution era

== Other ==
- Zapata Corporation, founded by George H. W. Bush
- Operation Zapata, code name for the failed CIA-backed Bay of Pigs Invasion Cuban exile training program
- Zapata metro station, a Mexico City Metro station
- Zapata Formation, geological formation in Patagonia

== Artworks ==
- Zapata (lithograph) created by Diego Rivera in 1932

== See also ==
- Zapatista (disambiguation)
- Emiliano Zapata (disambiguation)
