= Cuban wetlands =

Ecoregion in Cuba

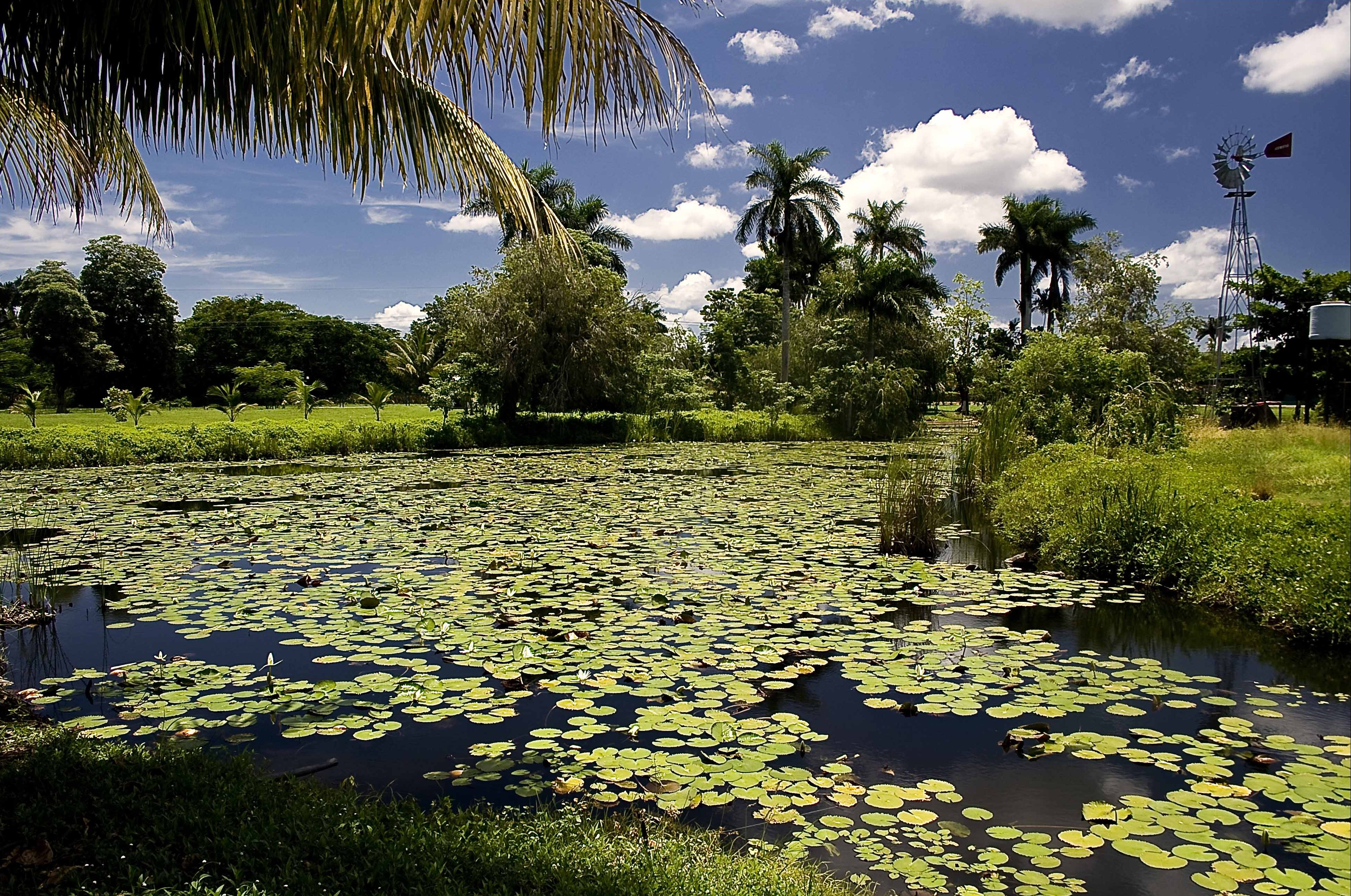
- Zapata Swamp

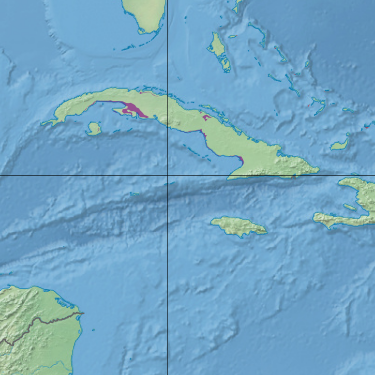
- Ecoregion territory (in purple)

Ecology
- Realm: Neotropical
- Biome: flooded grasslands and savannas
- Borders: Cuban dry forests; Cuban pine forests; Cuban moist forests; Greater Antilles mangroves

Geography
- Area: 5,631 km^{2} (2,174 sq mi)
- Country: Cuba

Conservation
- Conservation status: Critical/endangered
- Protected: 3,306 km^{2} (59%)

The Cuban wetlands is a flooded grasslands and savannas ecoregion on the island of Cuba and nearby smaller islands. The ecoregion covers 5,631 km^{2} (2,174 sq mi), about 4% of the island's area.

== Geography ==
The Cuban wetlands are found on lowland floodplains on island's northern and southern (Caribbean) shores. Most are fringed with mangroves nearer to the sea.

The largest wetland in Cuba is the Zapata Swamp, located in southern Matanzas Province, and extending west along the Gulf of Batabanó into southern Havana Province. Zapata Swamp has an area of 450 km^{2}. It lies between 22º01’ and 22º40’ N latitude and 80º33’ and 82º09’ W longitude in southern Matanzas province. The swamp extends 175 km east and west from Punta Gorda to Jagua, with an average width of 14 to 16 km, reaching a maximum width of 58 km from southern Torriente to Cayo Miguel.

Other wetlands along Cuba's southern shore include Pesquero Lake and Alcatraz Grande Lagoon in the western province of Pinar del Río, around the Gulf of Ana María in Ciego de Ávila and Camagüey provinces, and Birama Inlet and Leonero Lagoon along the Gulf of Guacanayabo.

On the northern shore, the larger wetlands are around the Bay of Santa Clara in Matanzas Province, and around Laguna de Leche in Ciego de Ávila Province.

Lanier Swamp is on the Isle of Youth, which lies south of the Cuban mainland.

== Flora ==
Plant communities include floating vegetation in areas of deeper water, permanently and seasonally flooded grasslands, and swamp forests.

== Fauna ==
The Zapata wren or ferminia (Fermina cerverai) and the Zapata rail (Cyanolimnas cerverai) are endemic to the Zapata Swamp. The Zapata sparrow (Torreornis inexpectata) lives in the Zapata Swamp and adjacent forests and cactus scrub.

== Protected areas ==
3,306 km^{2}, or 59%, of the ecoregion is in protected areas, including Ciénaga de Zapata Biosphere Reserve.
