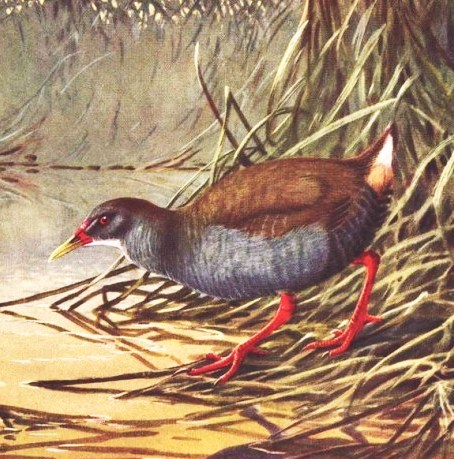
- Illustration by Allan Brooks

Conservation status
- Critically Endangered (IUCN 3.1)

Scientific classification
- Kingdom: Animalia
- Phylum: Chordata
- Class: Aves
- Order: Gruiformes
- Family: Rallidae
- Genus: Mustelirallus
- Species: M. cerverai

Binomial name
- Mustelirallus cerverai (Barbour & Peters, JL, 1927)
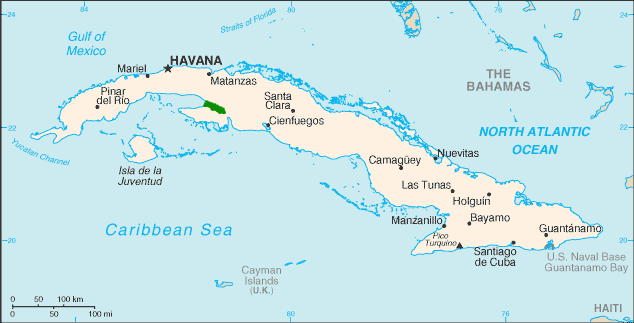
- Green shows known range

Synonyms
- Cyanolimnas cerverai

= Zapata rail =

Species of bird

The Zapata rail (Mustelirallus cerverai) is a medium-sized, dark-coloured rail. It has brown upperparts, greyish-blue underparts, a red-based yellow bill, white undertail coverts, and red eyes and legs. Its short wings render it almost flightless. It is endemic to the wetlands of the Zapata Peninsula in southern Cuba, where its only known nest was found in sawgrass tussocks. Little is known of its diet or reproductive behaviour, and its described calls may belong to a different species.

The species was discovered by Spanish zoologist Fermín Zanón Cervera in March 1927 in the Zapata Swamp near Santo Tomás, in the southern Matanzas Province of Cuba. The swamp holds one other bird found nowhere else, the Zapata wren, and also gives its name to the Zapata sparrow. Due to ongoing habitat loss in its limited range, its small population size, and predation by introduced mammals and catfish, the Zapata rail is evaluated as critically endangered on the IUCN Red List of Threatened Species. Tourism and climate change may pose threats in the future.

== Discovery and taxonomy ==
The Zapata rail was formally described by American herpetologist Thomas Barbour and his compatriot, ornithologist James Lee Peters, in 1927. They considered it distinctive enough to merit its own genus, Cyanolimnas. The genus name derives from Ancient Greek kuanos "dark blue" and Modern Latin limnas "rail or crake"; the specific name cerverai honours the rail's discoverer, Fermín Zanón Cervera, a Spanish soldier who had stayed on after the Spanish–American War and became a professional naturalist.

In 2023, the genus was reassigned to Mustelirallus The prefix Musteli comes from the Latin word for weasel combining the words mus meaning "mouse" and telum meaning "javelin" for the mammal's long body.

Barbour had been accompanied by the Spaniard on his previous visits to Cuba, and on hearing of the strange birds to be found in the Zapata area, he sent Cervera on a series of trips into the region. Cervera eventually found the rail near the very small settlement which is commemorated in the Spanish name for the rail, "Gallinuela de Santo Tomás". Cervera also discovered the Zapata wren and the Zapata sparrow, and his name is commemorated by the new ecological centre in the Ciénaga de Zapata National Park.

The rail family contains more than 150 species divided into at least 50 genera, the exact number depending on the authority. The Zapata rail is a member of the genus Mustelirallus, and is considered to be related with Pardirallus. All six species in the two genera are long-billed, five have drab plumage, and all but one have a red spot at the bill base. They are believed to be descended from Amaurornis-like ancestral stock.

== Description ==
This is a medium-sized, dark rail, approximately 29 cm (11.4 in) long. The upperparts are olive-brown and the forehead, head sides, and underparts are slate-grey, with some white barring on the lower belly. The flanks are grey-brown and the undertail is white. The iris, legs, and feet are red, and the bill is yellow with a red base. The tail feathers are only sparsely barbed, and the wings are very short and rounded. The sexes are similar in appearance, but immature birds are duller and have olive feet and bill; the chicks, as with all rails, are covered with blackish down. The Zapata rail's call is described as a bouncing cutucutu-cutucutu-cutucutu similar to that of the bare-legged owl, and a loud limpkin-like kuvk kuck. However, these calls may actually be those of the spotted rail.

There are no similar species in Cuba; the sympatric spotted rail is much the same size, but is heavily spotted and barred with white. The Zapata rail's plumage is intermediate between those of the Colombian crake and the plumbeous rail, but these are mainland birds of Central and South America.

== Distribution and habitat ==
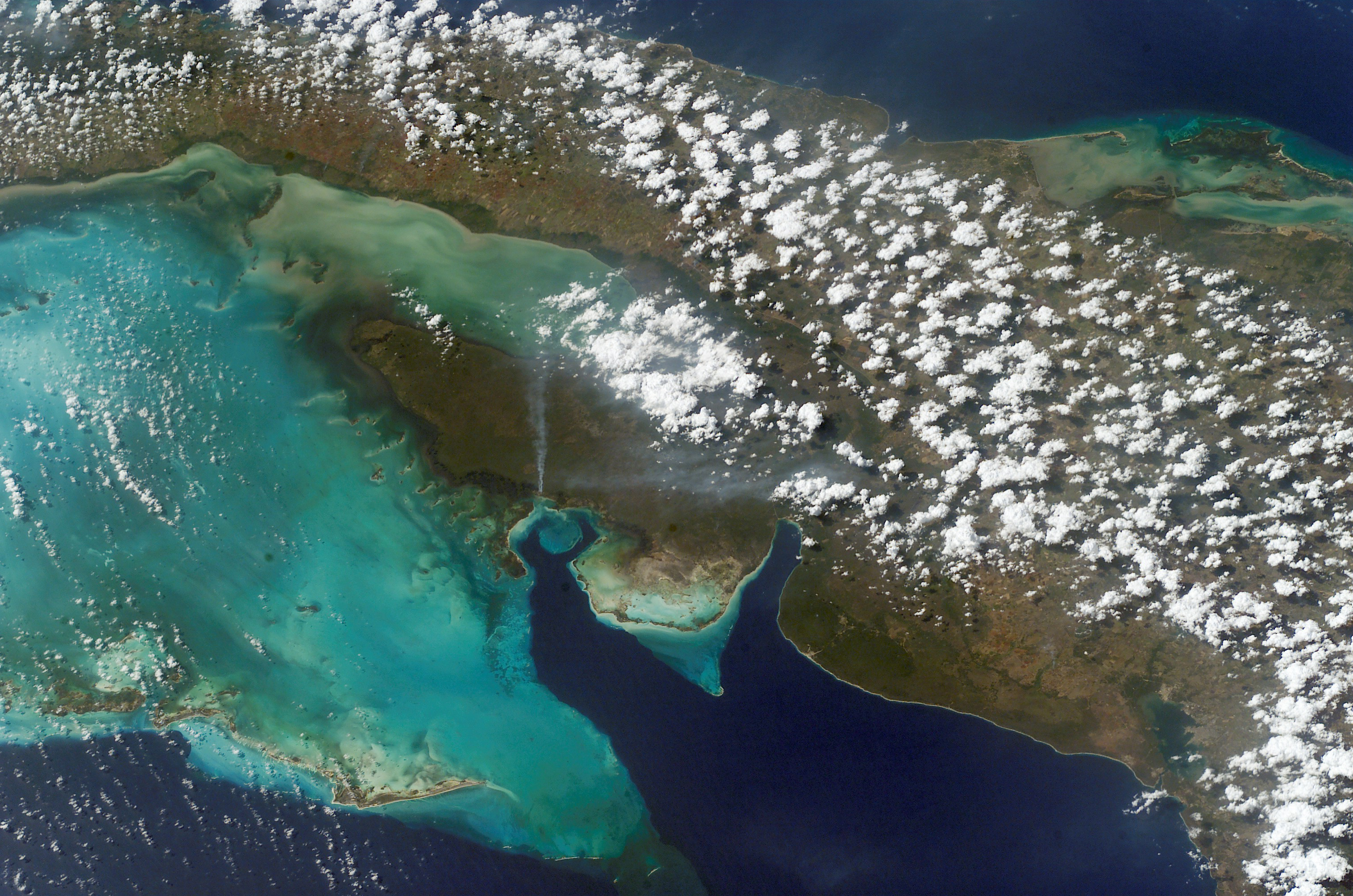
Aerial view of the Zapata Swamp

This rail is a Cuban endemic restricted to the northern part of the 4500 km^{2} (1740 mi^{2}) Zapata Swamp, which is also the only location for the Zapata wren and the nominate subspecies of the Zapata sparrow. The favoured habitat of the Zapata rail is flooded vegetation, 1.5–2.0 m (60–80 in) tall, consisting of tangled, bush-covered swamp and low trees, and preferably near higher ground. Typical plants of the swamp are wax myrtle, the willow Salix longipes, the sawgrass Cladium jamaicensis, and the narrow leaf cattail.

The species was once more widespread, with fossil bones found at Havana, Pinar del Río, and the Isla de la Juventud. Barbour did not believe that the rail, Zapata sparrow, and Zapata wren were relics in the sense that they once ranged widely over Cuba (as did, for example, the dwarf hutia and the Cuban crocodile), since the birds are so highly modified for swamp conditions. He considered that conditions similar to those found today may once have extended over the large submerged area now represented by the shallow banks, with scattered mangrove keys, which stretch towards the Isla de la Juventud and perhaps eastward along the southern Cuban coast. The birds fossilized at Isla de la Juventud are smaller than the single extant specimen, but the paucity of available material makes it impossible to establish whether the populations were genuinely different.

== Behaviour ==
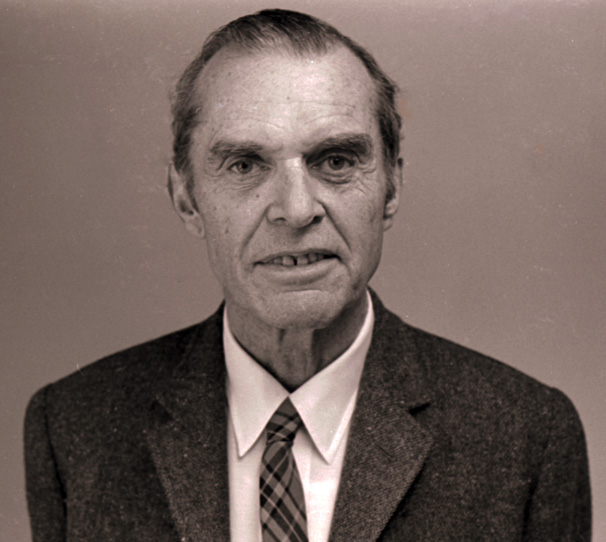
James Bond found the only known nest and eggs.

The Zapata rail usually breeds in Cladium jamaicensis sawgrass, building the nest above water-level on a raised tussock. Breeding occurs around September, and possibly also in December and January. American ornithologist James Bond found a nest containing three white eggs 60 cm (2 ft) above water level in sawgrass, but little else is known of the breeding biology. Rails are usually monogamous, and all have precocial chicks which are fed and guarded by the adults.

The bird prefers to feed in sawgrass. The diet is not recorded, but most marsh rails are omnivorous, feeding on invertebrates and plant material. The rails may disperse in the rainy season, returning to permanently flooded areas in the dry months.

Like other rails, this species is difficult to observe as it moves through the sawgrass, and may crouch to avoid detection, but is not usually particularly wary. When disturbed, it may run a short distance and then stop with its tail raised and the conspicuous white undertail showing. Despite its short wings, the Zapata rail may not be completely flightless. On morphological grounds it would be classed as a flightless species, since the pectoral girdle and wing are as reduced as in other species of rails that are considered to be flightless, but Bond reported that he saw one flutter about ten feet across a canal.

== Conservation status ==
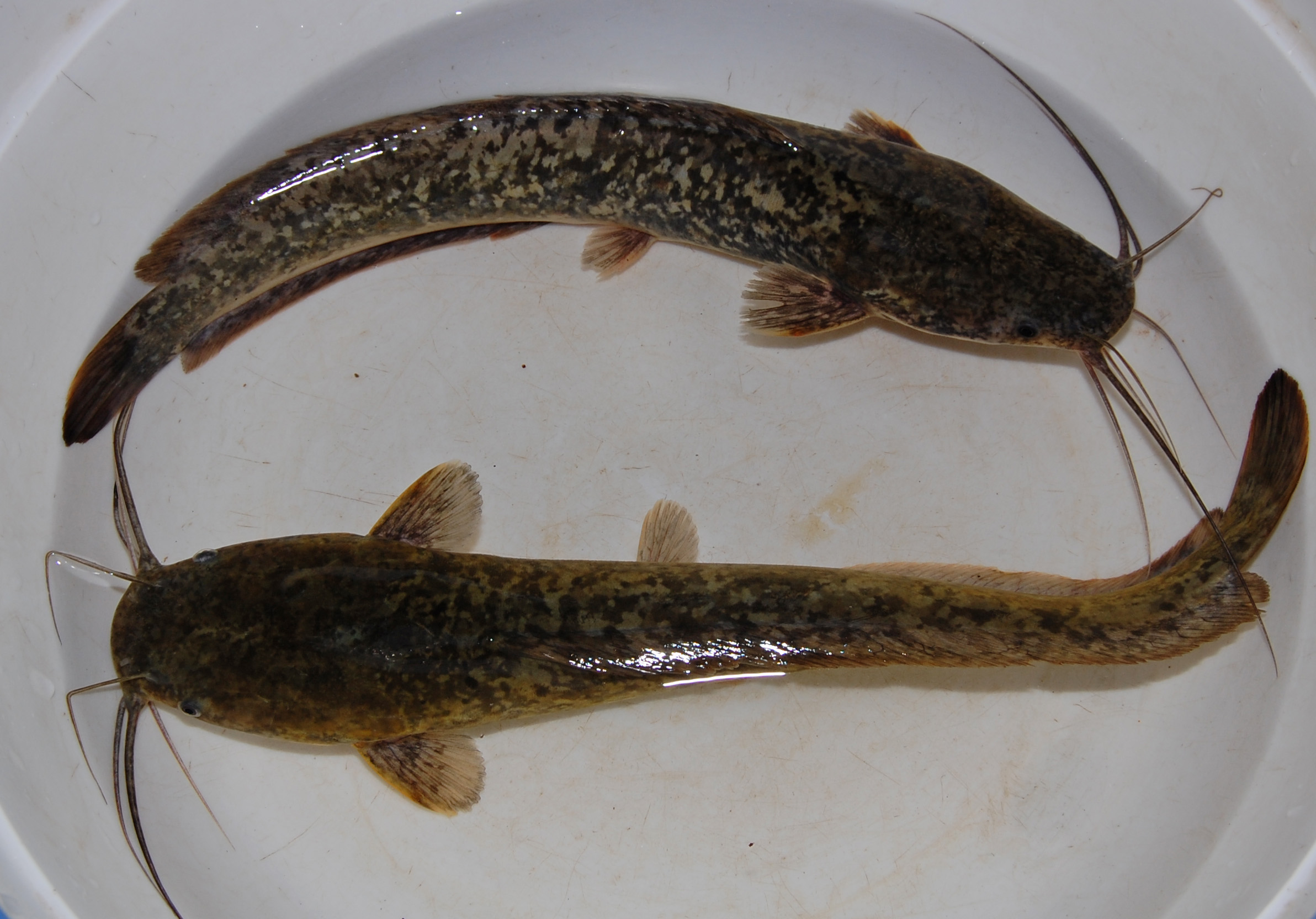
The African sharptooth catfish is a major predator of rail chicks.

Island species of rails are particularly vulnerable to population loss since they frequently and rapidly evolve to become flightless or very weak fliers, and are very susceptible to introduced predators. Fifteen species have become extinct since 1600, and more than 30 are endangered.

The species appears to have been easily found in the Santo Tomás area until 1931, but there were no further records until the 1970s when birds were found 65 km (40 mi) away at Laguna del Tesoro. The few records in subsequent years suggest that numbers remain low, although after no official sightings for two decades, a 1998 survey found the birds at two new locations in the Zapata Swamp. Ten rails were detected at Peralta, and seven at Hato de Jicarita. On the basis of this sample it was estimated that 70–90 rails were present in the 230 hectares (570 acres) between the two sites. As of 2026, the last sighting was in November 2014, itself the first for several years.

The Zapata rail is restricted to a single area, with an extent of about 1,000 km^{2} (400 mi^{2}), and its small population, estimated on the basis of recent surveys and local assessments of population densities at 250–1,000 individuals, is assessed as decreasing. In the past, grass-cutting for roof thatch was a cause of extensive loss of breeding habitat, and habitat loss through dry-season burning of the vegetation continues. Predation by introduced small Asian mongooses and rats is a problem and, more recently, introduced African sharptooth catfish (Clarias gariepinus) have been identified as major predators of rail chicks.

M. cerverai was classified as endangered on the IUCN Red List until 2011, when its status was uplisted to critically endangered. This had already been suggested since, given the lack of knowledge about its calls, the rail's population may be lower than currently estimated.

Two remaining sites are in protected areas: the Corral de Santo Tomás Faunal Refuge and the Laguna del Tesoro nature tourism area. Surveys have recently been conducted throughout the species' range and proposed conservation measures include the control of dry season burning.

=== Future threats ===
Cuba has plans to encourage more tourists, including to the Zapata area, and changes to United States policy mean that its citizens are allowed to visit Cuba. In the future, this could further increase the effects of ecotourism; this might have a dangerous impact on the wetland, but there are ways in which the impact of mass tourism can be mitigated.

In the longer term, the Ramsar-listed swamp itself may be threatened. Rising sea levels due to global warming could contaminate the wetland with saltwater, damaging the plants and fauna, and by 2100 the area of Ciénaga de Zapata would be reduced by one-fifth. Higher ocean temperatures resulting from climate change could also lead to stronger hurricanes and drought. Bouza warned that the fallen vegetation left by hurricanes could act as fuel for further damaging fires once it had dried out.

== Cited texts ==
- Bond, James; Eckelberry, Don R; Singer, Arthur B; Poole, Earl L (2001). A Field Guide to Birds of the West Indies. Peterson Field Guides. Houghton Mifflin. ISBN 0-618-00210-3.
- Fuller, Errol (2000). Extinct Birds. Oxford University Press. ISBN 0-19-850837-9.
- Jobling, James A. (1992). A Dictionary of Scientific Bird Names. Oxford University Press. ISBN 0-19-854634-3.
- Raffaele, Herbert A; Wiley, James; Garrido, Orlando H; Keith, Allan R; Raffaele, Janis I (2003). Field Guide to the Birds of the West Indies. Christopher Helm. ISBN 0-7136-5419-8.
- Roots, Clive (2006). Flightless Birds. Greenwood Press. ISBN 0-313-33545-1.
- Taylor, Barry; van Perlo, Ber (2000). Rails. Pica / Christopher Helm. ISBN 1-873403-59-3.
