= Domingo Zapata =

Spanish artist & writer

- Born: Palma, Mallorca, Spain
- Education: Regent's University London; American University
- Movement: Neo-expressionism; Pop art, Zapatista
- Spouse: Miranda Planas-Backman
- Children: 2
- Writing career
- Notable work: The Beautiful Dream of Life
- Website: dzapata.com

Domingo Zapata is a Spanish artist, writer, filmmaker, chef and fashion designer. He became a full-time artist in 2002 and sold his first major painting to George Soros in 2005. Since then, he has had over 100 international exhibits and shows. In 2017, he launched a fashion collection at New York Fashion Week. That same year, he published his first novel, The Beautiful Dream of Life, which is currently being made into a film.

== Early life and education ==
Zapata was born in Palma, Mallorca, Spain, and is ethnically from Andalusia, Spain. In 1993, he moved to London and studied art at the Regent's University London. He then moved to Washington, D.C. where he attended American University and studied contemporary and studio art. Prior to embarking on an art career, Zapata moved to New York City in 1999 and worked in finance and, briefly, in the music industry as a chairman for IMC Records (he is credited as a co-writer on an updated version of the Los del Río song, "Macarena").

== Career ==
In 2002, while Zapata was still working on Wall Street, he began pursuing his hobby of painting. It was at this time, one of his paintings of polo horses attracted the attention of contractor Michael Borrico. In 2004, Borrico hosted a private art show at his home that contained some of Zapata's paintings. Businessman George Soros attended that event and later purchased Zapata's Blue Horse in 2005.

In 2011, Haute Living magazine commissioned Zapata to do the cover art for 24 issues of the magazine. In 2010, he created a 35-by-15-foot mural for the Wynwood Walls in Miami. Also that year, Polaroids of Lohan that he took and then painted over were sold to a British collector for $100,000 USD. The work is a part of his series Ten, for which Kim Kardashian, Sofía Vergara, and Michelle Rodriguez have also modeled. In 2013, 30 of his works were displayed for the Venice Biennale at the Palazzo da Mula. Many of the paintings exhibited were part of Zapata's Mona Lisa series, a collection of pieces featuring Leonardo da Vinci's Mona Lisa in various "disguises." In July 2014, Zapata's painting of the crucifixion of Jesus was put on display at the Palma Cathedral.

In 2015, he entered into a licensing agreement with clothing company Alice + Olivia, and collaborated with the footwear brand Superga. Zapata's Superga shoe collection featured 11 styles based on his original paintings.

Later that year, Domingo began to channel his energies into charity work with children and education. This initiative began with a TEDxSyracuse talk discussing the healing powers of art.

In 2016, Zapata announced that he had sold a novel to Gallery Books, an imprint of Simon & Schuster. The semi-autobiographical novel, The Beautiful Dream of Life, was published in July 2017. The novel has been adapted into a film that is in pre-production at this time for filming in 2027.

In February 2017, Zapata unveiled a clothing collection at New York Fashion Week based on his artwork. He also organized other shows at New York Fashion Week and Los Angeles Fashion Week in 2018. The New York Post described Zapata as the "new Andy Warhol, with starlets begging for a sitting." His collaboration with Alice + Olivia and the CFDA, A + O X DOMINGO ZAPATA, furthered the fusion between his art and fashion.

In the summer of 2019, Zapata painted the largest vinyl mural in the history of New York City, in Times Square, on the East, West and South facades of the One Times Square building. On each of these three facades, it wrapped 15 stories in length and 300 feet in height, covering a total area of 30,000 square feet in total painted surface. The motifs used by Zapata for this work included a retrospective of his prior work including Polo Players, Pandas, Flamenco dancers and Flowers, all influenced by his native Spain and time spent living in New York City. It was created by a team of 25 people, working with Zapata for more than 3 weeks to complete his work with scaffolding suspension holding the crew over 200–400 feet above NYC during the installation and painting. It was maintained and featured in Times Square through the summer of 2020. It was partially painted, and partially printed on vinyl. After it was taken down, it was cut into 6-by-6-foot squares and donated to charities in support of art education. He did further charity work in 2023 when he donated a mural and additional works including fashion pieces to Northwell Health for an $150 million health care fundraising drive for behavioral health initiatives for at risk children with mental health challenges. Also that year, he painted a 45 foot mural for the Children’s Hospital at New York Hospital. It was sold for charity into blocks.

Zapata has had multiple audiences with Pope Francis, and many of the meetings produced artistic collaborations. The initial meeting in 2019 was a celebration of immigrants and Zapata remarked, "I'm a citizen of the world and a constant immigrant, and I come from a humble background. The subject of immigration, therefore, is important to me. Especially in an age where people want to build walls between countries. I disagree with this thinking and I want to raise the issue and make a point out of it." This meeting led to Zapata being named an ambassador for Pointifical Scholas Occurrentes Foundation. The initial artistic collaboration between the Pope and Zapata was auctioned for $500,000 US in benefit to the Schools Occurrentes charity.

In 2021, Zapata and actor Jordi Mollà participated in the documentary The Private Lives of Jordi Mollà & Domingo Zapata, directed by Giuseppe Ferlito and produced by the English production house Publikro London.

In March 2022, Zapata was chosen by Louvre and Grand Palais Immersif curators as one of the artists, along with Picasso, Dalí, Basquiat, and Warhol, to be exhibited at a new immersive exhibition in the Palacio de la Bolsa in Marseille, France. Joconde: Exposition Immersive explores Leonardo da Vinci's painting Mona Lisa.

Domingo Zapata has had over 100 solo shows in the past 20 years throughout the Americas, Asia, and Europe including at the prestigious Art Basel Miami Beach and Venice Biennale .

Zapata has been strongly influenced by his father who is originally from Alcaudete, Jaen. In 2019, the town recognized his contribution to the arts by naming a street in his honor. Since 2021 in homage to his father, he has actively participated and collaborated in the town’s annual bull fighting tradition. To further honor his father’s memory, an annual “corrida zapatista” has been staged with world famous matador, Sebastian Castella. The festivals have been held in arenas in Palma, Mallorca, Cali, Colombia and in Beziers, France. The 2026 corrida zapatista took place during the Beziers Feria attended by 1 million visitors. During each event, all of the matadors and the arena is painted and decorated by Zapata in honor of his beloved father’s memory.

In 2026, Zapata was asked to design, construct and paint the world’s largest mural which is anticipated to take more than 5 years to complete. Jerry Inzerillo, CEO of Diriyah Gate Development Authority, tapped Zapata for the project. It is supported by Saudi Arabia’s monarch, Mohammed bin Salman Al Saud, who has championed investing in the nation’s cultural infrastructure as part his $2 trillion Vision 2030 initiative.

== Personal life ==
Zapata’s primary studio and home is in Dubai. He travel extensively as well. In 2026, he married Miranda Planas-Backman. He has two children from his first marriage, Dominga and Paul.

== Style and Persona ==
Zapata has been referred to as the "next Andy Warhol" for both his pop art sensibilities and his celebrity lifestyle. He has also been described as a neo-expressionist because of his use of bright colors and his "visceral," "graffiti-like" painting method. Zapata has noted that he uses color to evoke and represent emotion (usually happiness). Many of his works explore thematic elements such as "sexuality, opulence, and vitality," often incorporating text into the artwork. Zapata often creates different series based on a single theme. These include his Polo series, Matador series, Ten series, Mona Lisa series, and Panda series.

== Cultural Awards ==
1) Cultural Impact Award. Awarded to Domingo Zapata by the United Nations for his leadership and support for art in education as an engine to transform future generations. Sept 20, 2023. Public Foundation

2) Brooklyn Borough President Honors Domingo Zapata as an Most Influential Artist of the Year- Latino Heritage 2019

3) Extraordinary Four Award. The School of Heroes. The Guiding Light of Peace Award. June 2022

4) Lab School of Washington, 2016 Gala - Honored Outstanding Achievement for those with learning disability (former award winners include Tom Cruise, James Earl James, Cher, Gavin Newsome)
