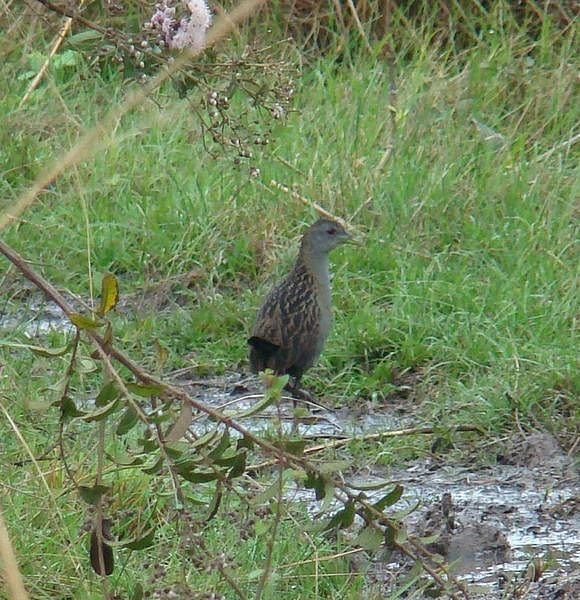
- Birigüi, São Paulo, Brazil.

Conservation status
- Least Concern (IUCN 3.1)

Scientific classification
- Kingdom: Animalia
- Phylum: Chordata
- Class: Aves
- Order: Gruiformes
- Family: Rallidae
- Genus: Mustelirallus
- Species: M. albicollis

Binomial name
- Mustelirallus albicollis (Vieillot, 1819)

Synonyms
- Porzana albicollis

= Ash-throated crake =

Species of bird

The ash-throated crake (Mustelirallus albicollis) is a species of bird in the subfamily Rallinae of the rail, crake, and coot family Rallidae. It is found in every mainland South American country except Chile.

== Taxonomy and systematics ==
The taxonomy of genus Mustelirallus and that of the ash-throated crake in particular have not been settled. The International Ornithological Committee (IOC), the South American Classification Committee of the American Ornithological Society (SACC), and the Clements taxonomy moved the species from genus Porzana in 2015. The SACC and Clements also moved the Colombian crake and paint-billed crake from genus Neocrex to Mustelirallus while the IOC retains them in Neocrex. In addition, BirdLife International's Handbook of the Birds of the World (HBW) retains the ash-throated crake in Porzana and the other two in Neocrex.

This article uses the IOC/SACC/Clements genus. The IOC, Clements, and HBW agree that the ash-throated crake has two subspecies, the nominate M. a. albicollis and M. a. typhoeca. The SACC does not include subspecies in its published list.

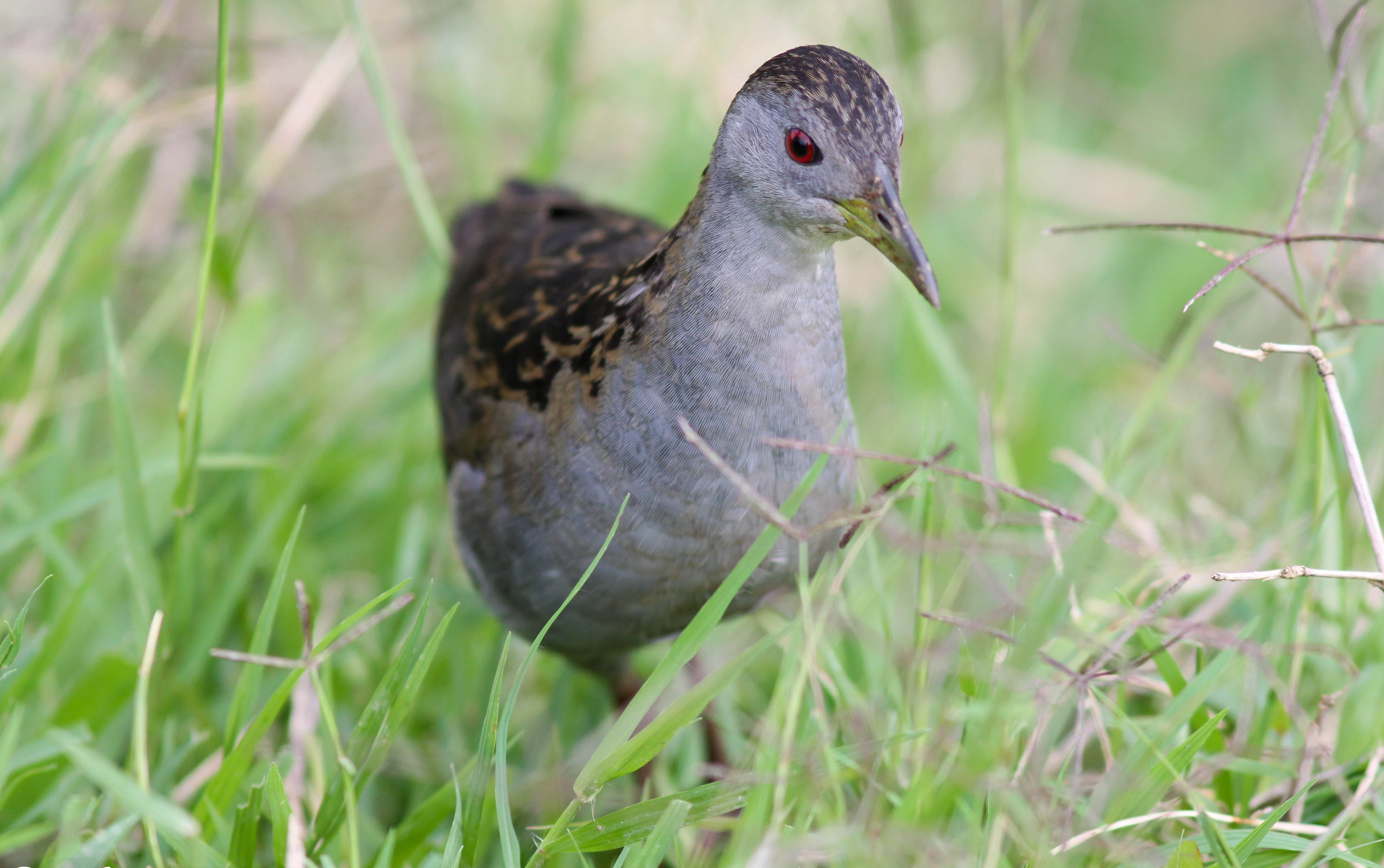
SE Brazil

== Description ==
The ash-throated crake is 21 to 24 cm (8.3 to 9.4 in) long and weighs 90 to 120 g (3.2 to 4.2 oz). The sexes have the same plumage. Adults of the nominate subspecies have black upperparts with brown edges to the feathers, a pale gray throat, breast, and belly, and black and white bars on the flanks and undertail coverts. They have a short greenish bill and purplish brown legs. Subspecies M. a. typhoeca is smaller and paler than the nominate.

== Distribution and habitat ==
The ash-throated crake's subspecies have completely separate ranges. M. a. typhoeca is the more northerly. It is found from Colombia east through Venezuela, extreme northern Brazil, and the Guianas and south into far northeastern Ecuador. It previously occurred on Trinidad but has been extirpated from there. M. a. albicollis is found in eastern and southern Brazil, southeastern Peru, northern and eastern Bolivia, eastern Paraguay, extreme northern Argentina, and extreme northern Uruguay. The species inhabits a wide variety of damp to wet landscapes including freshwater marshes, moriche swamps, rice fields, savanna, and pastures, though it tends to be in the drier parts of marshes and swamps. In elevation it ranges from sea level to 1,200 m (3,900 ft).

== Behavior ==
=== Movement ===
The ash-throated crake is generally thought to be sedentary, but some apparent seasonal movements have been noted in Colombia.

=== Feeding ===
The ash-throated crake usually forages out of sight in vegetation but sometimes emerges to the edges of it. Its diet is grass seeds and adults and larvae of insects such as Lepidoptera, Formicidae, and Coleoptera.

=== Breeding ===
The ash-throated crake's breeding season has not been fully defined but it possibly nests at any time of year. The nest is a large open bowl made out of dry grass, on the ground or just above it, and often hidden between tree roots or grass. The clutch is usually two or three eggs but can be as many as six. Nothing else is known about the species' breeding biology.

=== Vocalization ===
The ash-throated crake's song is "a repeated, loud, fast series of vibrating notes, sounding like machine-gun 'd'd'd'd'd'-ou'." It also makes "a sharp 'tuk'" call. It mostly vocalizes in early morning and evening.

== Status ==
The IUCN has assessed the ash-throated crake as being of Least Concern. It has a very large range but its population size and trend are unknown. No immediate threats have been identified. The species is "solitary, shy and difficult to observe" so its abundance and even its exact range limits are hard to determine.
