= Cuban cactus scrub =

Xeric shrubland ecoregion

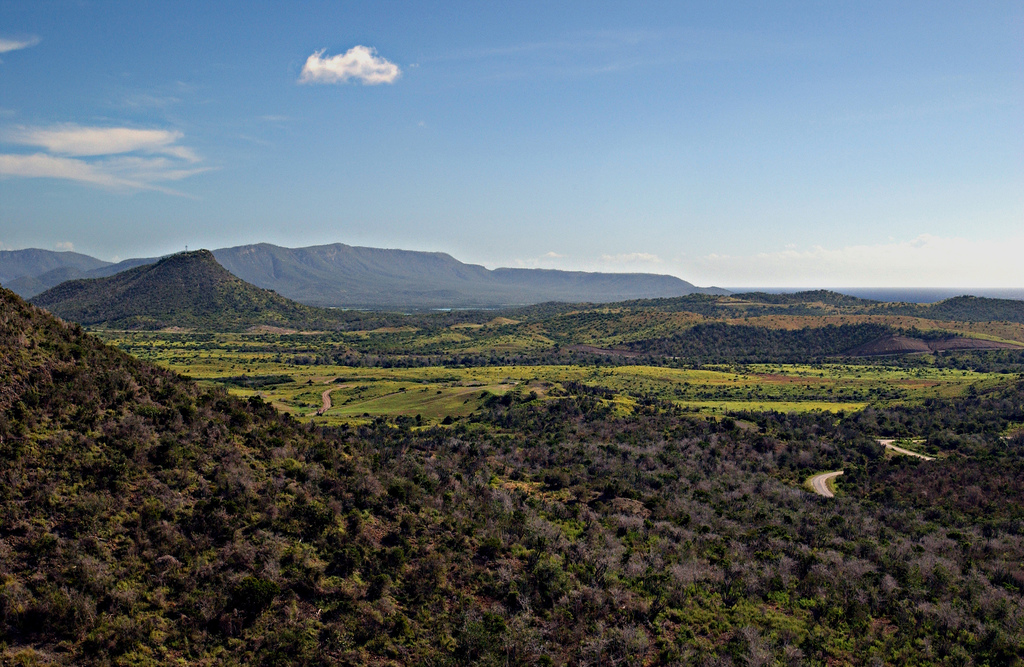
- Near Caimanera, Guantánamo Province

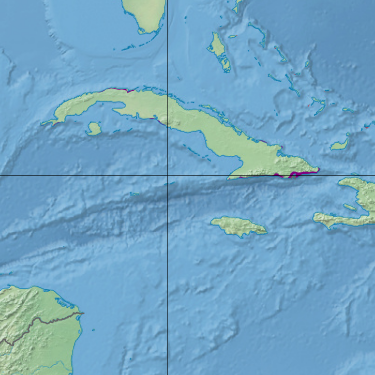
- Ecoregion territory (in purple)

Ecology
- Biome: Deserts and xeric shrublands
- Bird species: 244
- Mammal species: 32

Geography
- Area: 3,300 km^{2} (1,300 sq mi)
- Country: Cuba

Conservation
- Conservation status: Vulnerable
- Habitat loss: 23%
- Protected: 28.31%

The Cuban cactus scrub is a xeric shrubland ecoregion that occupies 3,300 km^{2} (1,300 sq mi) on the leeward coast of Cuba. Most of it occurs in the southeastern part of the island in the provinces of Guantánamo and Santiago de Cuba. The ecoregion receives less than 800 mm (31 in) of rainfall annually. The principal soils are coastal rendzinas that were derived from coralline limestone. Cuban cactus scrub contains four vegetation zones: xerophytic coastal and subcoastal scrubland, coastal thorny semidesert, coastal sclerophyllous scrubland, and rocky coastal scrublands.

== Xerophytic coastal and subcoastal scrubland ==
Vegetation in the xerophytic coastal and subcoastal scrublands reaches a height of 6 m (20 ft) and is dominated by palms and succulents, especially cacti. Common evergreen plants include cafecillo (Bourreria virgata), mostacilla (Capparis cynophallophora), guairaje (Eugenia foetida), Bursera glauca, B. cubana, Croton spp., Cordia spp., Calliandra colletioides, Caesalpinia spp., Acacia spp., Phyllostylon brasiliense, Pseudosamanea cubana and guayacán negro (Guaiacum officinale). Tuna (Opuntia stricta), O. militaris, pitahaya (Harrisia eriophora), jijira (H. taetra), miramar (Pilosocereus polygonus), aguacate cimarrón (Dendrocereus nudiflorus), maguey (Agave spp.), erizo (Melocactus spp.) and Leptocereus spp. are typical succulents.

== Coastal thorny semidesert ==
Coastal thorny semidesert is similar to xerophytic coastal and subcoastal scrubland in that they both have the same succulent composition and reach a height of 6 m (20 ft). However, succulents represent a smaller proportion of the plant life in this zone. Other plant species include vomitel colorado (Cordia sebestena), manzanillo (Hippomane mancinella) and lirio de costa (Plumeria filifolia).

== Coastal sclerophyllous scrubland ==
The vegetation in this zone is sclerophyllous, meaning that their leaves are hard. It reaches a height of 3 m (9.8 ft) with emergent trees up to 5–6 m (16–20 ft). This zone represents the transition between xeric shrublands and moister dry forests. Plant life includes yana (Picrodendron baccatum), carne de doncella (Maytenus buxifolia), yamaguey de loma (Pictetia spinosa), granadillo (Brya ebenus) and ébano (Diospyros grisebachii).

== Rocky coastal scrublands ==
The most sparse and stunted vegetation is found in this zone, which occurs adjacent to the ocean on karstic soil. The flora is tolerant of wind and salt spray, and includes romero de playa (Borrichia arborescens), incienso de playa (Tournefortia gnaphalodes), and verdolaga de playa (Sesuvium maritimum).

== Fauna ==
Birds of the cactus scrub include the Zapata sparrow (Torreornis inexpectata sigmani), Cuban vireo (Vireo gundlachii), Cuban gnatcatcher (Polioptila lembeyei), and Oriente warbler (Teretistris fornsi). The yellow-striped pygmy eleuth (Eleutherodactylus limbatus) is a species of frog endemic to this ecoregion, while several anole species and the Cuban rock iguana (Cyclura nubila nubila) are endemic lizards.
