= Fermín Zanón Cervera =

Spanish zoologist (1875–1944)

Fermín Zanón Cervera (1875–1944) was a Spanish zoologist, born in Godelleta, Valencia. He fought in Cuba in the Spanish–American War and stayed on after as a member of the Civil Guard prior to becoming a professional naturalist. He worked in the Cuban Ministry of Agriculture and Agronomy where he was conservator of the entomological collection.

American herpetologist Thomas Barbour had been accompanied by Cervera on his visits to Cuba, and on hearing of the strange birds to be found in the Zapata Swamp, he sent the Spaniard on a series of trips into the region. There he discovered three bird species new to science that he sent to Barbour for formal description.

The binomial names given by Barbour to two of the new species commemorate their finder.

- Zapata wren (Ferminia cerverai)
- Zapata sparrow (Torreornis inexpectata)
- Zapata rail (Cyanolimnas cerverai)

The wren, rail and one subspecies of the sparrow are endemic to the swamp. Cervera also found many new insects, especially of the order Neuroptera.

In 1927 Cervera returned to Spain to continue working as an entomologist, and remained in his hometown of Godelleta until his death in 1944.
