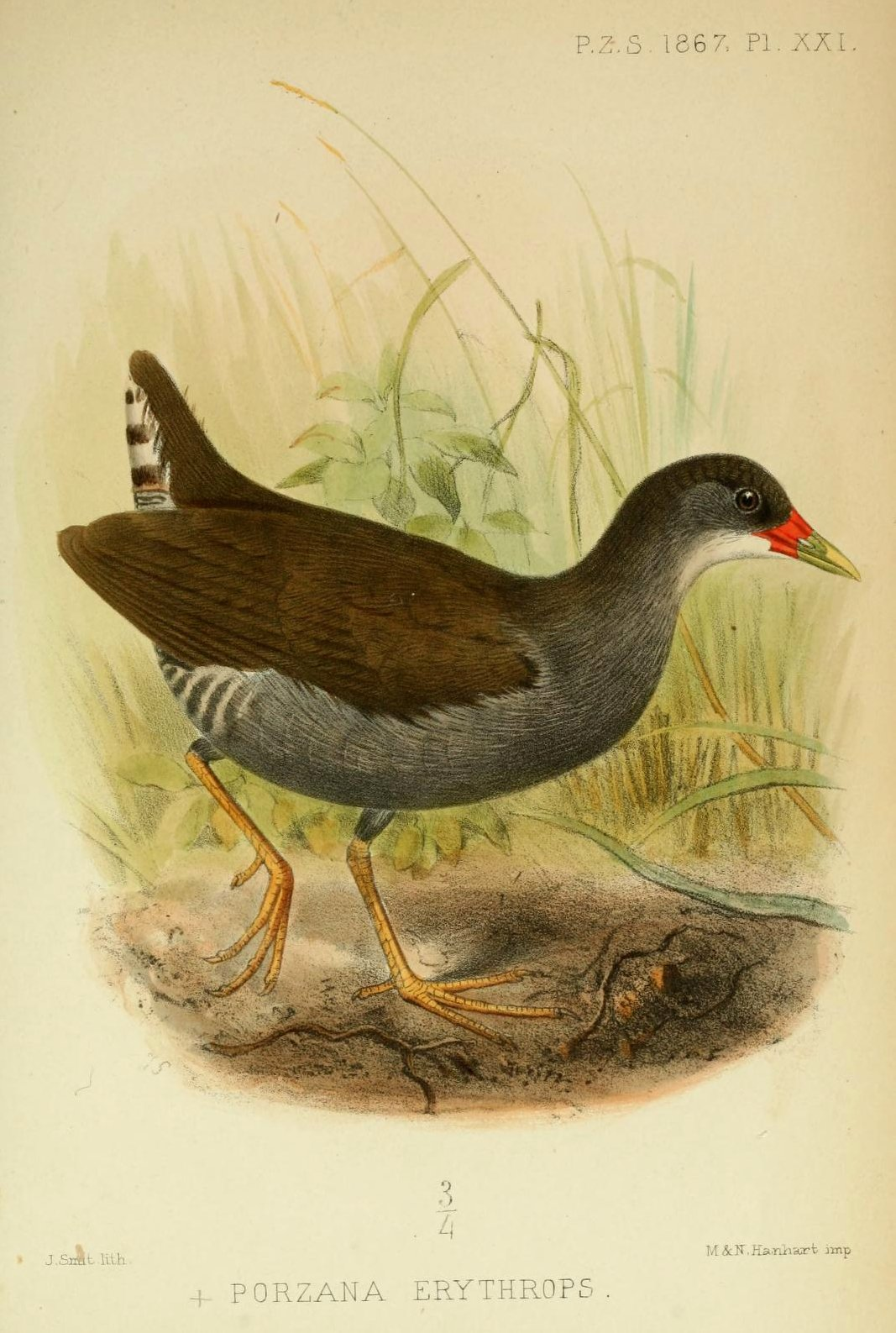
- Neocrex erythrops erythrops P.L.Sclater, 1867 from Proceedings of the Zoological Society of London (vol. 1867, plate XXI)

Scientific classification
- Kingdom: Animalia
- Phylum: Chordata
- Class: Aves
- Order: Gruiformes
- Family: Rallidae
- Tribe: Pardirallini
- Genus: Mustelirallus; Bonaparte, 1856

Synonyms
- Neocrex P.L. Sclater & Salvin, 1869; Cyanolimnas Barbour & Peters, 1927

= Mustelirallus =

Genus of birds

Mustelirallus is a genus of birds in the family Rallidae. The birds are indigenous to the Neotropics, with one species endemic to Cuba. The type species is ash-throated crake.

== Species ==
It contains the following species:

Image	Scientific name	Common name	Distribution
	Mustelirallus colombianus	Colombian crake	Colombia, Ecuador, and Panama
	Mustelirallus erythrops	Paint-billed crake	Argentina, Bolivia, Brazil, Colombia, Costa Rica, Ecuador, French Guiana, Guyana, Panama, Paraguay, Peru, Suriname, Trinidad and Tobago, and Venezuela.
	Mustelirallus albicollis	Ash-throated crake	Colombia, Venezuela, Trinidad and Tobago, Guianas, Brazil, Bolivia and Paraguay.
	Mustelirallus cerverai	Zapata rail	Endemic to the Zapata Peninsula in Cuba.
