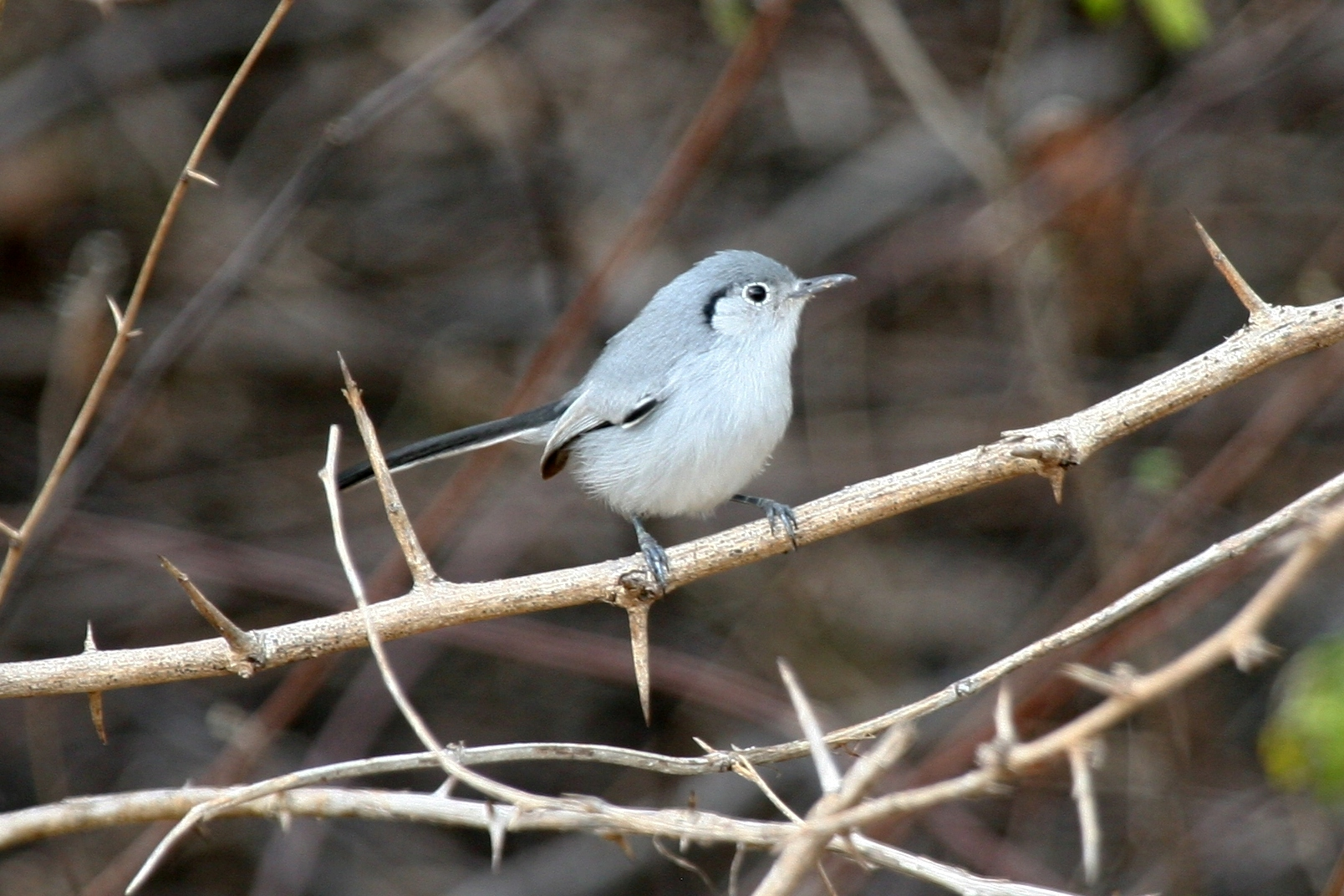

Conservation status
- Least Concern (IUCN 3.1)

Scientific classification
- Kingdom: Animalia
- Phylum: Chordata
- Class: Aves
- Order: Passeriformes
- Family: Polioptilidae
- Genus: Polioptila
- Species: P. lembeyei

Binomial name
- Polioptila lembeyei (Gundlach, 1858)

= Cuban gnatcatcher =

Species of bird

The Cuban gnatcatcher (Polioptila lembeyei) is a species of bird in the family Polioptilidae, the gnatcatchers. It is endemic to Cuba.

== Taxonomy and systematics ==
"The Cuban gnatcatcher was described by the most famous of this island's ornithologists, the naturalised Juan (Johannes) Gundlach". It was named in honor of Juan Lembeye.

The Cuban gnatcatcher is monotypic.

== Description ==
The Cuban gnatcatcher is 10 to 11 cm (3.9 to 4.3 in) long and weighs 4.5 to 5 g (0.16 to 0.18 oz) and is among the smallest members of genus Polioptila. Like most members of the genus, the male is blue-gray above and white below. It has a unique black crescent behind the eye and ear coverts and a long black tail with white outer feathers. The female is similar but paler, and its facial crescent is thinner. The juvenile is olive-gray above and has buffy flanks, a creamy belly, and only a faint facial crescent.

== Distribution and habitat ==
The Cuban gnatcatcher is found along much of the north and southeast coasts of Cuba and also in disjunct areas along the south coast. It inhabits xeric scrubland, mostly below 100 m (330 ft) of elevation.

== Behavior ==
=== Feeding ===
The Cuban gnatcatcher's diet has not been thoroughly documented; it is assumed to be small insects and spiders. It forages actively among the lower branches of vegetation.

=== Breeding ===
The Cuban gnatcatcher's breeding season extends from March to July. Its nest is a deep cup constructed by both sexes using hair, vegetable fibers, and small leaves and lined with softer material. It hangs from a fork in a small branch of a spiny bush up to 6.4 m (21 ft) above the ground. The clutch size varies from two to five but is usually three. In a detailed study cited by Atwood et al (2020), 35 of 38 clutches were predated before the young fledged.

=== Vocalization ===
The Cuban gnatcatcher's song is "a sustained rambling, disorganized series of warbles, whistles and chattering notes" .

== Status ==
The IUCN has assessed the Cuban gnatcatcher as being of Least Concern. However, "[its] restricted habitat is considered vulnerable to grazing and habitat conversion."
