= Diospyros grisebachii =

Scientific classification
- Kingdom: Plantae
- Clade: Tracheophytes
- Clade: Angiosperms
- Clade: Eudicots
- Clade: Asterids
- Order: Ericales
- Family: Ebenaceae
- Genus: Diospyros
- Species: D. grisebachii

Binomial name
- Diospyros grisebachii (Hiern) Standl.

Synonyms
- Ebenus grisebachii (Hiern) Kuntze; Maba grisebachii Hiern; Macreightia buxifolia Griseb.

Species of tree

Diospyros grisebachii is a tree in the family Ebenaceae. It is endemic to Cuba. Various vernacular names refer to D. grisebachii as ébano.

== Uses ==
The wood of D. grisebachii is used in carpentry. Older specimen yield a variegated, black heartwood, similar to other species of Diospyros. Other parts of D. grisebachii have been reported to be used in traditional medicine.
