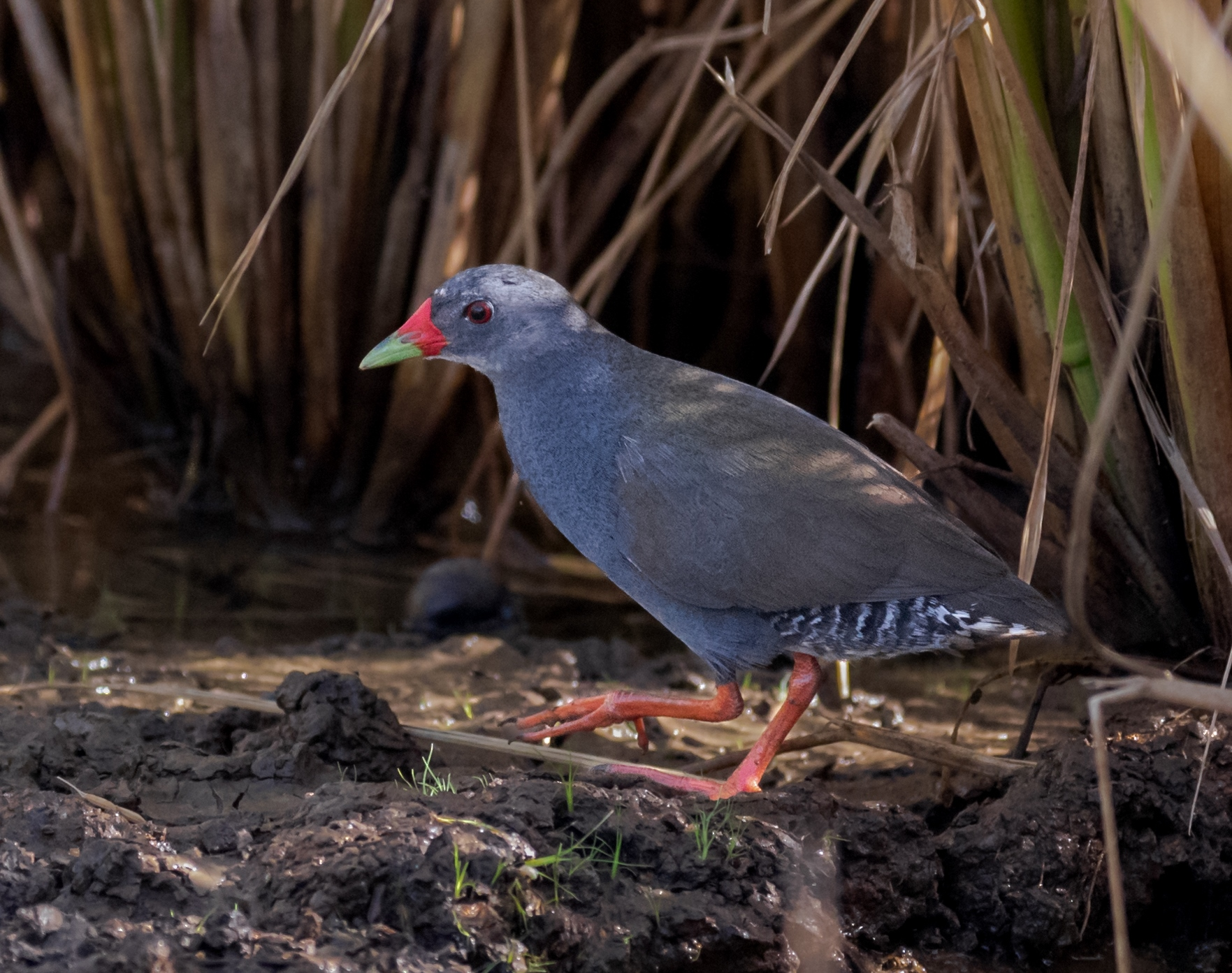

Conservation status
- Least Concern (IUCN 3.1)

Scientific classification
- Kingdom: Animalia
- Phylum: Chordata
- Class: Aves
- Order: Gruiformes
- Family: Rallidae
- Genus: Mustelirallus
- Species: M. erythrops

Binomial name
- Mustelirallus erythrops (Sclater, PL, 1867)
- Range (note: distribution in Central America and the Galapagos is missing.)

Synonyms
- Neocrex erythrops

= Paint-billed crake =

Species of bird

The paint-billed crake (Mustelirallus erythrops) is a species of bird in the subfamily Rallinae of the rail, crake, and coot family Rallidae. It is found in Costa Rica, Panama, every mainland South American country except Chile and Uruguay.

== Taxonomy and systematics ==
The paint-billed crake was initially placed in genus Porzana and later moved to genus Neocrex to join the Colombian crake (N. colombiana). The two have been sometimes been considered conspecific. In 2015 the South American Classification Committee of the American Ornithological Society (AOS) and the Clements taxonomy moved both species to genus Mustelirallus. In 2023 the International Ornithological Committee (IOC) moved them to genus Mustelirallus. However, the North American Classification Committee of AOS (NACC), and BirdLife International's Handbook of the Birds of the World (HBW) retain them in Neocrex.

This article uses the IOC/NACC/HBW genus. The IOC, HBW, and Clements agree that the paint-billed crake has two subspecies, the nominate N. e. erythrops and N. e. olivascens.

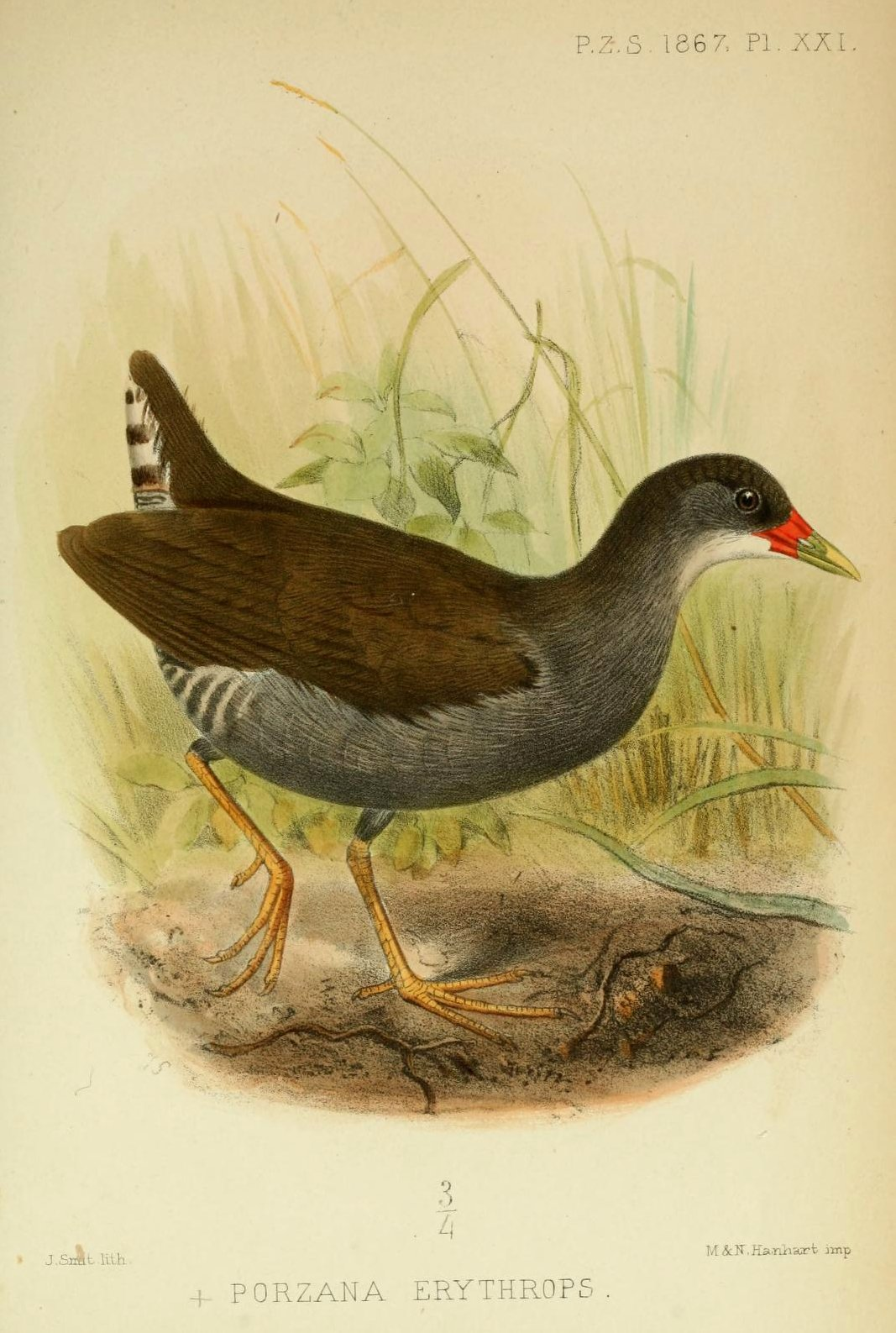

== Description ==
The paint-billed crake is 18 to 20 cm (7.1 to 7.9 in) long and weighs about 40 to 70 g (1.4 to 2.5 oz). One specimen had a wing of 20 cm (7.9 in), a tarsus of 2.8 cm (1.1 in), and weighed 43 g (1.5 oz). The species gets its common name from its red and yellow bill; it has bright red legs. The sexes are alike. The nominate subspecies has a brown crown, nape, and upperparts including the tail. Its throat is white and its face, throat, and breast are gray. Its flanks, belly, and vent are barred black and white. N. e. olivascens is similar but darker and with less white on its throat.

== Distribution and habitat ==
The nominate subspecies of paint-billed crake is found in coastal Ecuador, coastal Peru, and the Galápagos Islands. Subspecies N. e. olivascens is much more widespread, but is found in several widely separated areas. In Central America it is found in Costa Rica and Panama. On the South American mainland it is found in Argentina, Bolivia, Brazil, Colombia, French Guiana, Guyana, Paraguay, Peru, Suriname, and Venezuela. It has been recorded as a vagrant on Trinidad and in the U.S. states of Texas and Virginia.

The species inhabits a wide variety of landscapes, from the very wet like reedbeds and marshes, to wet and dry pastures and rice fields, fairly dry bushy areas, and (in the Galápagos) humid woodlands. In South America it seems partial to swamp and savanna habitats with much grass and thickets. In elevation it ranges from near sea level to almost 3,400 m (11,200 ft)

== Behavior ==
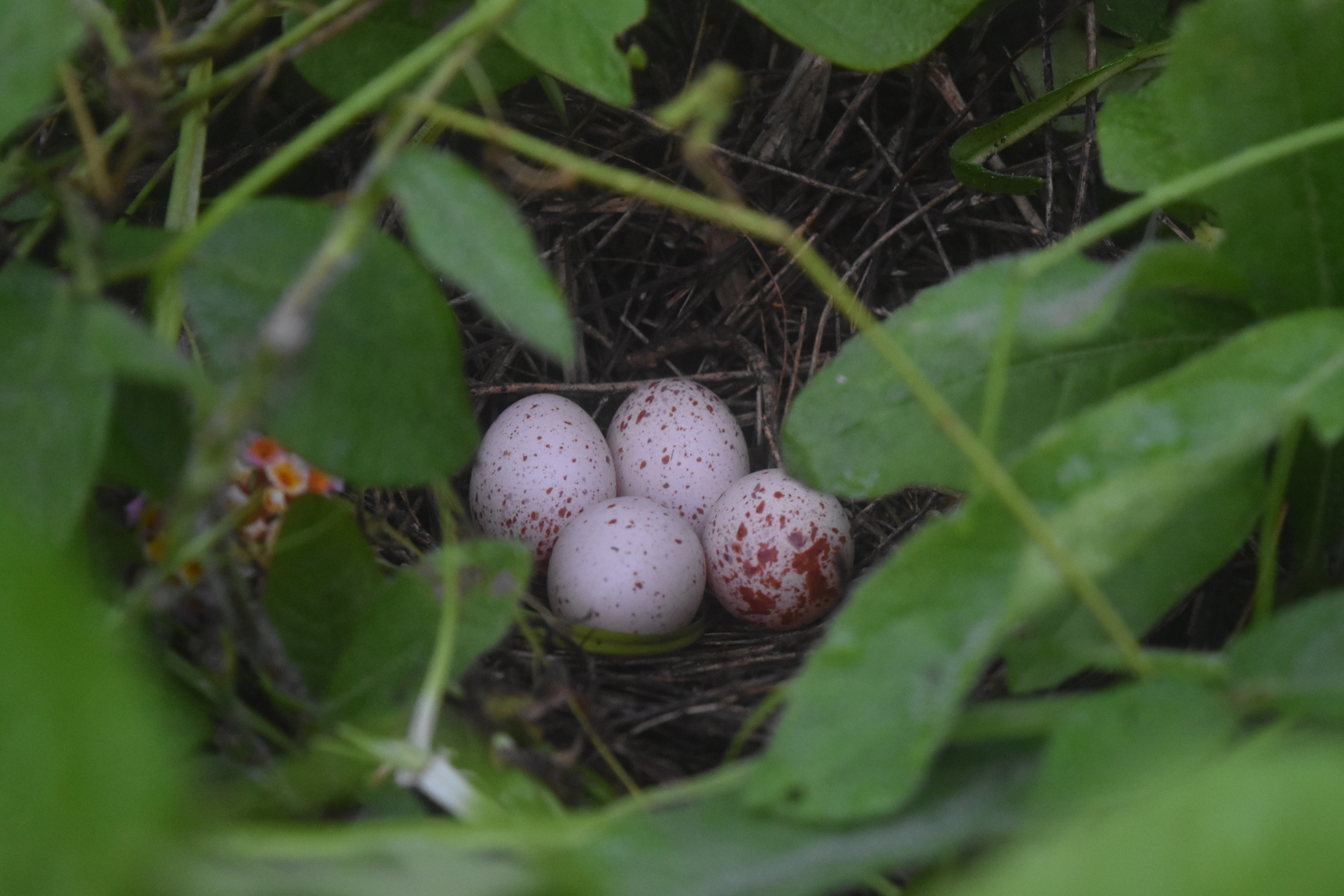
Paint-billed crake nest on Floreana Island in the Galápagos

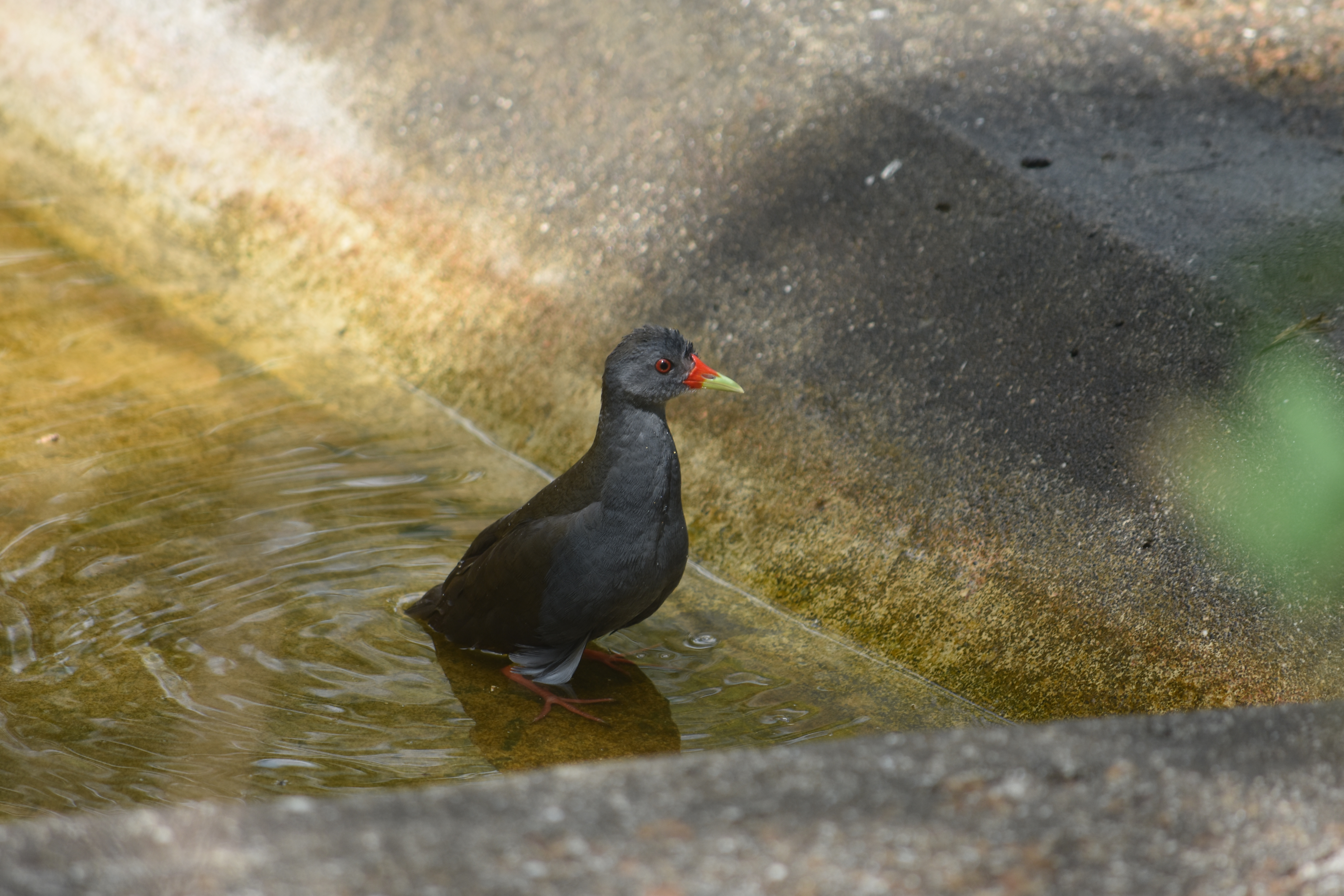
Paint-billed crake taking a bath on Floreana Island in the Galápagos

=== Movement ===
There is no evidence that the paint-billed crake makes regular movements. However, it has been found many times far outside its normal range, so it is at least prone to vagrancy and might have migratory populations. It does not respond to playback.

=== Feeding ===
Little is known about the paint-billed crake's feeding habits or diet. It is known to eat invertebrates including Diplopoda and Coleoptera and also seeds. It forages in soil, leaf litter, and standing water, and at dawn and dusk has been noted feeding in open areas next to dense vegetation.

=== Breeding ===
The paint-billed crake's breeding season varies widely across its range. It builds a bowl nest of green grass on or near the ground and at least partially hidden in grass. It lays a clutch of three to seven eggs; they are creamy buff and have large reddish blotches near the blunt end. The incubation period is at least 23 to 25 days.

=== Vocalization ===
The paint-billed crake's song is "a long, gradually accelerating series of up to 36 staccato somewhat yelping 'kjek' notes". Its calls include "frog-like, guttural, buzzy, single notes", "a mellow soft purring", and "a sharp 'twack'".

== Status ==
The IUCN has assessed the paint-billed crake as being of Least Concern. It has a very large range but its population size and trend are unknown. No immediate threats have been identified. The species is "very furtive and difficult to observe" so its abundance and even its exact range limits are hard to determine. Its "status and distribution need investigation, as do movements and breeding".
