= Ciénaga de Zapata Biosphere Reserve =

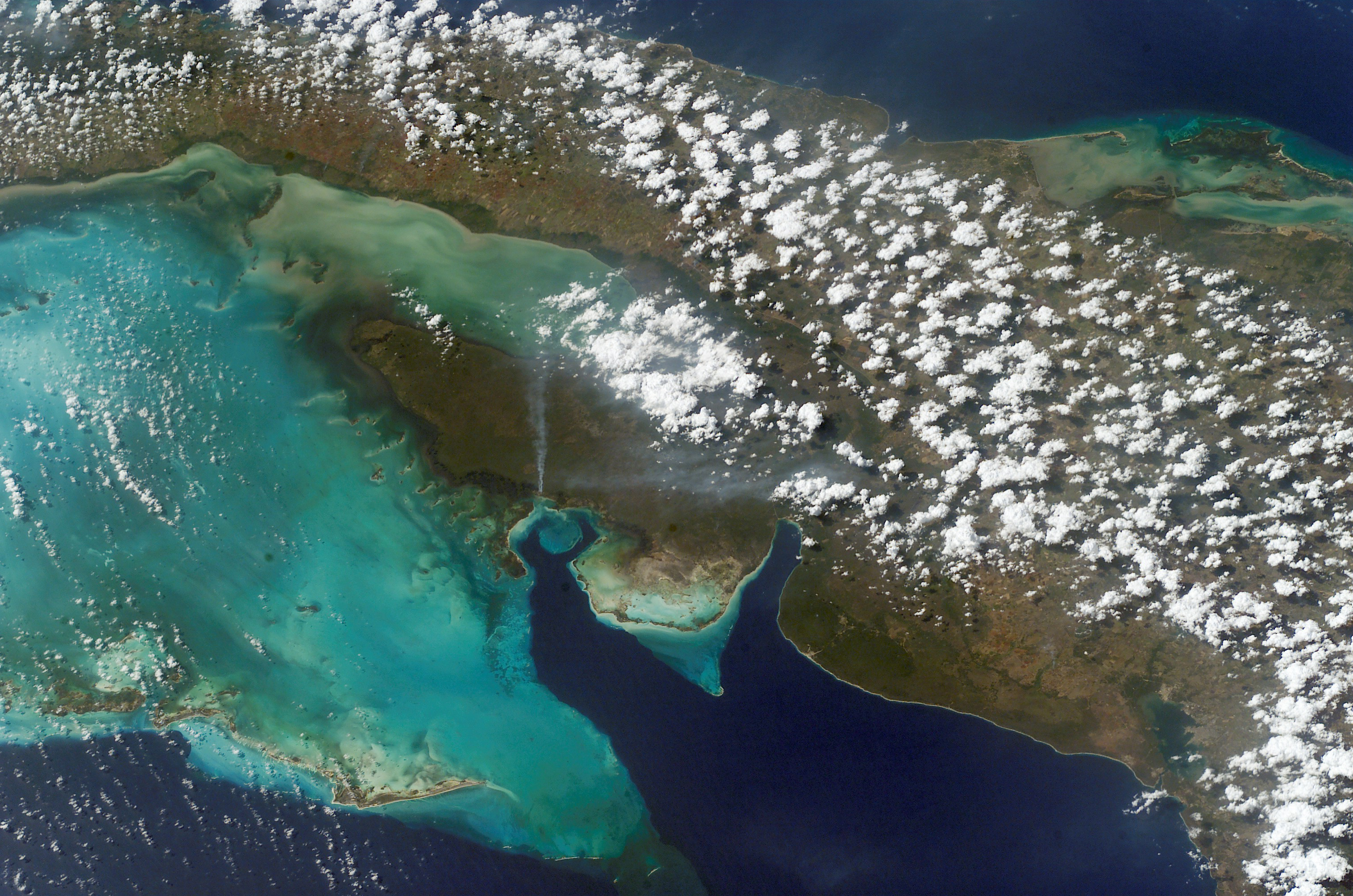

- Location within Cuba
- Location: Cuba
- Coordinates: 22°24′00″N 81°34′00″W
- Area: 628,171 hectares (2,425.38 sq mi)
- Governing body: Ministerio de Ciencia, Tecnología y Medio Ambiente (CITMA)

The Ciénaga de Zapata Biosphere Reserve (established 2000) is a UNESCO Biosphere Reserve situated on the southern coast of Cuba at Matanzas province. The 628,171 hectares (2,425.38 sq mi) reserve encompasses the Zapata Swamp and is one of the largest and most important wetlands in the Caribbean region with a marine southern borderline. Ciénaga de Zapata was designated a Ramsar site in 2001. This area is a cluster biosphere reserve with several core areas, highly valuable for conservation located in the Ciénaga de Zapata National Park.

This reserve shows a great diversity of ecosystems and land cover types as grasslands, mangrove forests, Ciénaga forest, and semi-deciduous forest, evergreen coastal and sub-coastal forest; coastal and sub-coastal matorral, and coral reefs with principal coral species and coastal lagoons. The area also supports the main populations of the Cuban crocodile (Cocodrilus rhombifer) and American crocodile (C. acutus) and birds as the American flamingo (Phoenicopterus ruber). As of 2001, some 9,000 people, mostly of Spanish origin, live permanently in one of the largest biosphere reserves in Cuba. Economic activities are mainly silviculture, fisheries, community agriculture, tourism, handicraft and apiculture. Tourism is very important and brings more than 800,000 people to the area each year, for the benefit of the local communities. They are actively involved in decision-making processes through public hearings and peoples councils organized by the administration of the local government. As this biosphere reserve covers a whole watershed and entire protected areas, all long-term objectives for conservation, development of sustainable land-use practices is met. The region of the Ciénaga de Zapata Biosphere Reserve has been declared a Special region for sustainable development. This reserve is twinned with the Ría Lagartos Biosphere Reserve of Mexico.

== Area ==
The reserve's surface area (terrestrial and marine) is 625,354 hectares (2,414.51 sq mi). The core area is 196,828 hectares (759.96 sq mi), surrounded by buffer zone(s) of 317,337 hectares (1,225.25 sq mi) and transition area(s) of 111,189 hectares (429.30 sq mi).

== Sources ==
This article incorporates text from a free content work (license statement/permission). Text taken from UNESCO - MAB Biosphere Reserves Directory, UNESCO, UNESCO.
