= Giuseppe Ferlito (born 1975) =

Italian film director and screenwriter

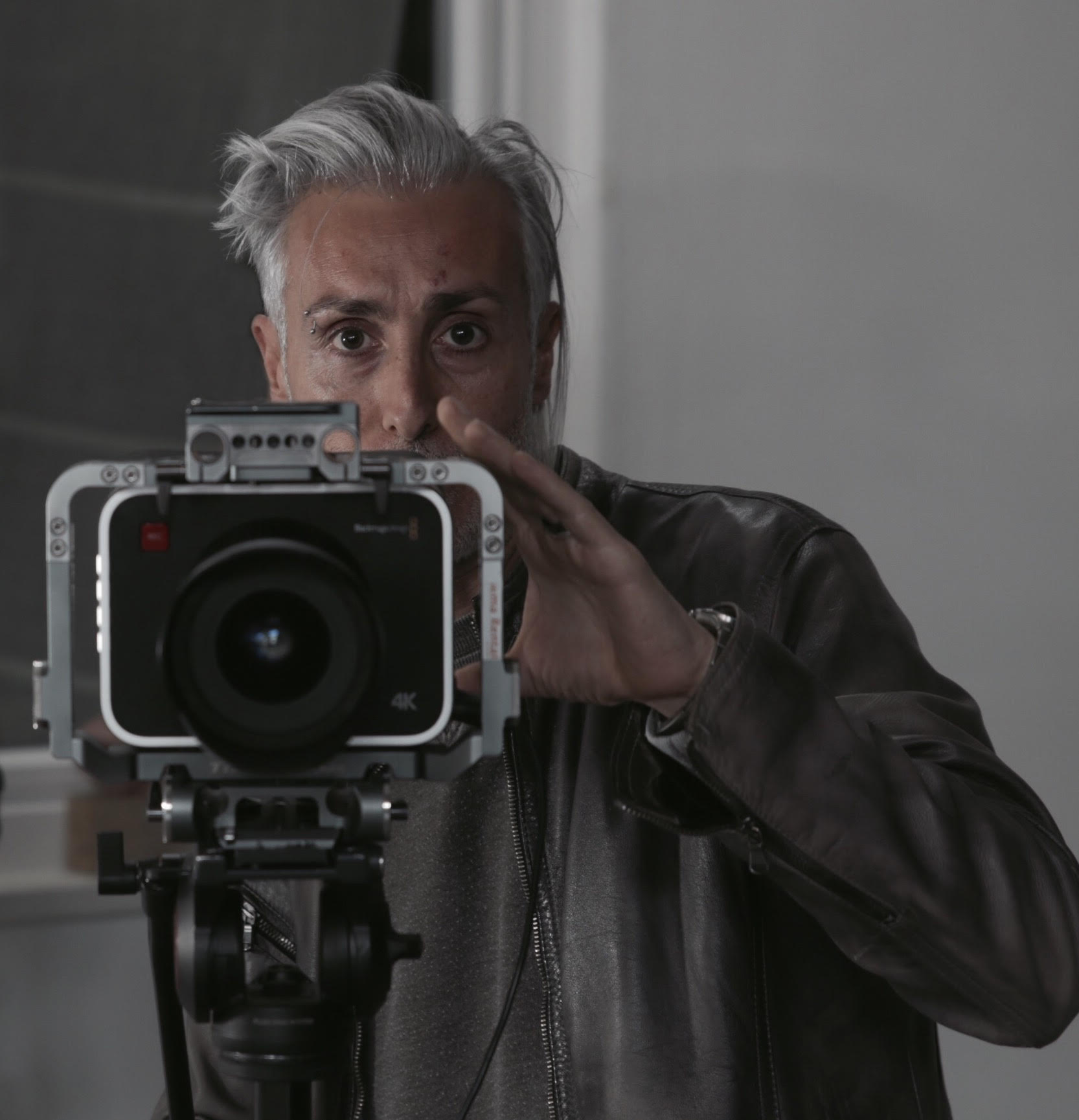
- Born: September 3, 1975 (age 50); Padua, Italy
- Occupations: Film director, screenwriter

Giuseppe Ferlito (born September 3, 1975) is an Italian film director and screenwriter.

== Biography ==
Giuseppe Ferlito was born in Padua, Italy. After earning a degree in political science at the University of Padua, he moved to Milan to complete a master’s degree in Cinema and Television Production. In Milan he worked freelance for several film production companies, producing advertisements and music videos.

Early in his career, Ferlito moved to Rome, where he worked in the film industry initially as a second assistant director and later as a first assistant director.

In 2010, he made his debut as a screenwriter, co‑writing the script for 88 with actor and director Jordi Mollà. The film was produced by Media Films, and Ferlito also served as second unit director.

In 2012, Ferlito made his directorial debut with the drama Presto farà giorno, which he wrote and co‑produced with Rai Cinema and Settima Entertainment. The film, shot entirely in Rome, explores social issues such as drug use and anorexia through the intertwined stories of three characters navigating personal struggles. Presto farà giorno was released in Italian cinemas on 20 March 2014 and received a Special Mention at the Ariano International Film Festival in 2014.

Ferlito co‑wrote the script for Duelo with Jordi Mollà in 2014.

In 2015, he received the Glass Lion award in the category “Venetian’s Excellency in Cinema” for original direction at Cinema Veneto, coinciding with the 72nd Venice Film Festival.

In 2018, he worked as second unit director on the film Red Land.

In 2021, Ferlito directed the documentary The Private Lives of Jordi Mollà & Domingo Zapata. The film premiered in Miami Beach, was presented at the 79th Venice International Film Festival, and was screened at the Morelia International Film Festival.

In 2022, Ferlito wrote and directed the short film Look Around, which addresses the theme of bullying and adolescent challenges. The film received recognition, including first place at the Spi Stories 2022 short film competition.

In 2025, he directed and co‑wrote the feature film El Caminar: Crónica de un regreso al origen with Karla Carbajal. The film, produced by Copalitas Films, is in post‑production as of early 2026 and was showcased at international events in Madrid.

== Filmography ==
=== Director ===
- El Caminar: Crónica de un regreso al origen (2026)
- The Sound of Flames (2025), co‑directed with Ye Yiyun
- Look Around – short – (2022)
- The Private Lives of Jordi Mollà & Domingo Zapata (2021)
- Una luce sempre accesa – short – (2021)
- I confini – short – (2020)
- In soccorso al tempo – short – (2017)
- Presto farà giorno (2013)
- Casa dolce Casa – short – (2011)

=== Second Unit Director ===
- Red Land (2018)
- 88 (2012)

=== Screenwriter ===
- El Caminar: Crónica de un regreso al origen (2026), co‑written with Karla Carbajal
- Look Around – short – (2022)
- The Private Lives of Jordi Mollà & Domingo Zapata (2021)
- Una luce sempre accesa – short – (2021)
- I confini – short – (2020)
- In soccorso al tempo – short – (2017)
- Duelo (2014)
- 88 (2012)
- Casa dolce Casa – short – (2011)
