= Colombian crake =

Conservation status
- Data Deficient (IUCN 3.1)

Scientific classification
- Kingdom: Animalia
- Phylum: Chordata
- Class: Aves
- Order: Gruiformes
- Family: Rallidae
- Genus: Mustelirallus
- Species: M. colombianus

Binomial name
- Mustelirallus colombianus (Bangs, 1898)

Synonyms
- Neocrex colombiana; Neocrex colombianus Bangs, 1898 [orth. error]

Species of bird

The Colombian crake (Mustelirallus colombianus) is a species of bird in the subfamily Rallinae of the rail, crake, and coot family Rallidae. It is found in Colombia, Ecuador, and Panama.

== Taxonomy and systematics ==
The Colombian crake's taxonomy has not been settled. The North American Classification Committee of AOS (NACC), the International Ornithological Committee (IOC), and BirdLife International's Handbook of the Birds of the World (HBW) place it in genus Neocrex. However, in 2015 the South American Classification Committee of the American Ornithological Society (AOS) and the Clements taxonomy moved it and the paint-billed crake (M. erythrops) to genus Mustelirallus.

This article uses the IOC/NACC/HBW genus. The IOC, HBW, and Clements agree that the paint-billed crake has two subspecies, the nominate M. c. colombianus and M. c. ripleyi.

== Description ==
The Colombian crake is 18 to 20 cm (7.1 to 7.9 in) long. The sexes are alike. The nominate subspecies has a brown crown, nape, and upperparts including the tail. Its throat is white and its face, throat, and breast are gray. Its flanks, belly, and vent are cinnamon. M. c. ripleyi is similar but significantly darker.

== Distribution and habitat ==
The nominate subspecies of Colombian crake is found from northern Colombia south into northwestern Ecuador. M. c. ripleyi is found from central Panama into northwestern Colombia's Chocó Department. There are few records of the species and the exact boundaries of the two subspecies' ranges are not known. The species inhabits wet to moist landscapes such as marshes, swamps, savanna, and the brushy edges of forest; not all of these have water bodies. In elevation it ranges from sea level to 2,100 m (6,900 ft).

== Behavior ==
=== Movement ===
The Colombian crake is considered to be sedentary.

=== Feeding ===
Nothing is known about the Colombian crake's feeding habits or diet. They are assumed to be similar to those of its closest relative, the paint-billed crake. That species forages in soil, leaf litter, and standing water, and at dawn and dusk has been noted feeding in open areas next to dense vegetation. It is known to eat invertebrates including Diplopoda and Coleoptera and also seeds.

=== Breeding ===
The Colombian crake's breeding season is not fully defined but appears to include at least December to February. Nothing else is known about its breeding biology.

=== Vocalization ===
As of late 2022 xeno-canto had only one recording of a Colombian crake vocalization and the Cornell Lab of Ornithology's Macaulay Library had none. That recording is of an immature bird being held by a researcher and is judged to be a distress call.

== Status ==
The IUCN originally assessed the Colombian crake in 1988 as Near Threatened, then in 1994 as Unknown, and since 2000 as Data Deficient. "It is very poorly known and its status, distribution and natural history demand urgent attention". "Nevertheless, there appears to be ample suitable habitat for [the] nominate subspecies in W Colombia and Ecuador."
