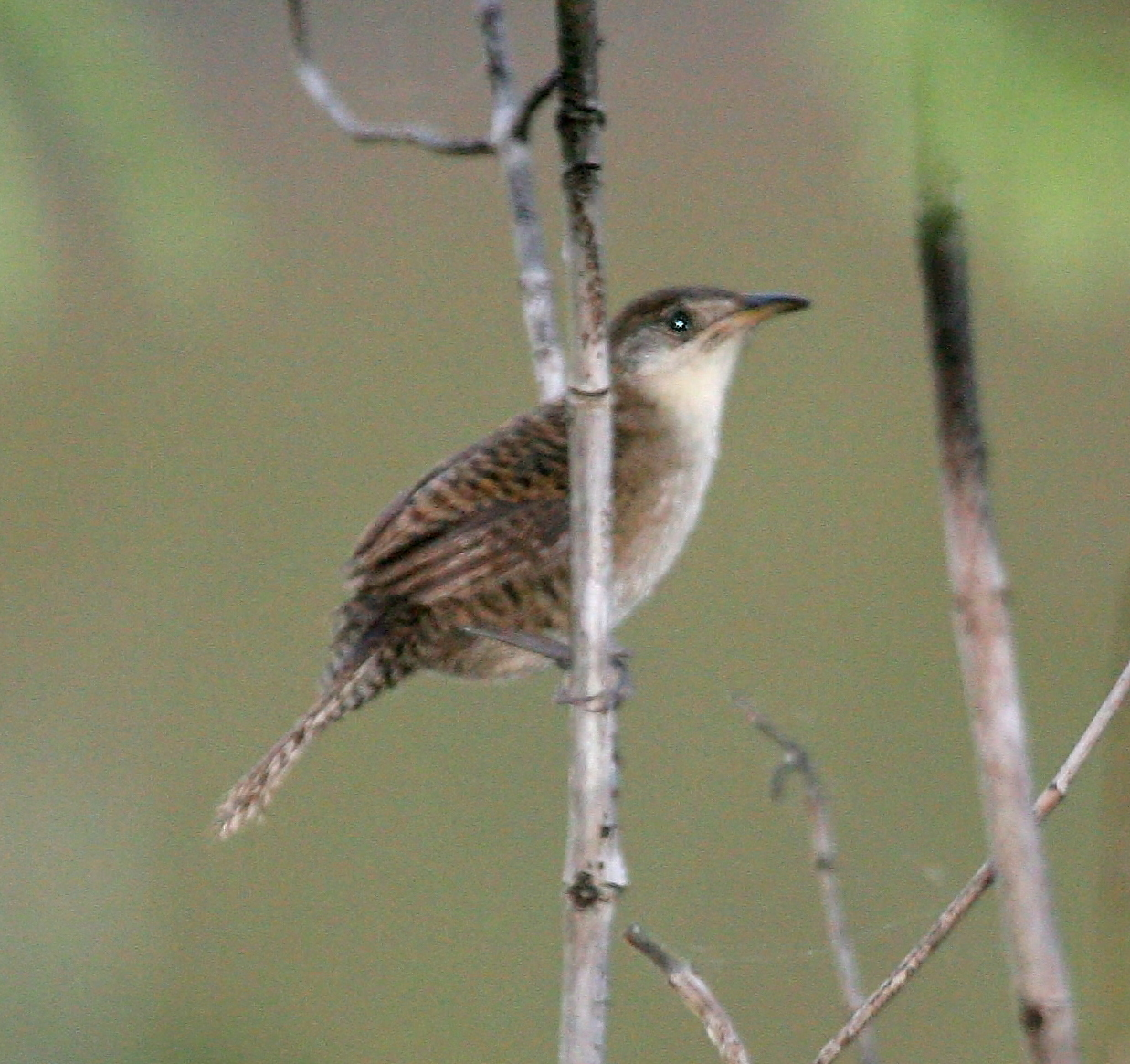

Conservation status
- Endangered (IUCN 3.1)

Scientific classification
- Kingdom: Animalia
- Phylum: Chordata
- Class: Aves
- Order: Passeriformes
- Family: Troglodytidae
- Genus: Ferminia; Barbour, 1926
- Species: F. cerverai

Binomial name
- Ferminia cerverai Barbour, 1926

= Zapata wren =

Species of bird

The Zapata wren (Ferminia cerverai) is a medium-sized grayish-brown bird that lives in dense shrubs of the Zapata Swamp, Cuba. It is the only member of the monotypical genus Ferminia, which is endemic to Cuba and endangered. This species was first described in 1926 by Thomas Barbour and named after its co-discoverer, Fermín Zanón Cervera.

== Description ==
Measuring about 16 centimetres (6.3 in) in length, it is brown overall, though striped with black and with grayish underparts. Its tail is long. The bird's song is similar to that of the house wren, in that it is high-pitched and loud, described as a "musical warble preceded by guttural note, given in series of three or four phrases."

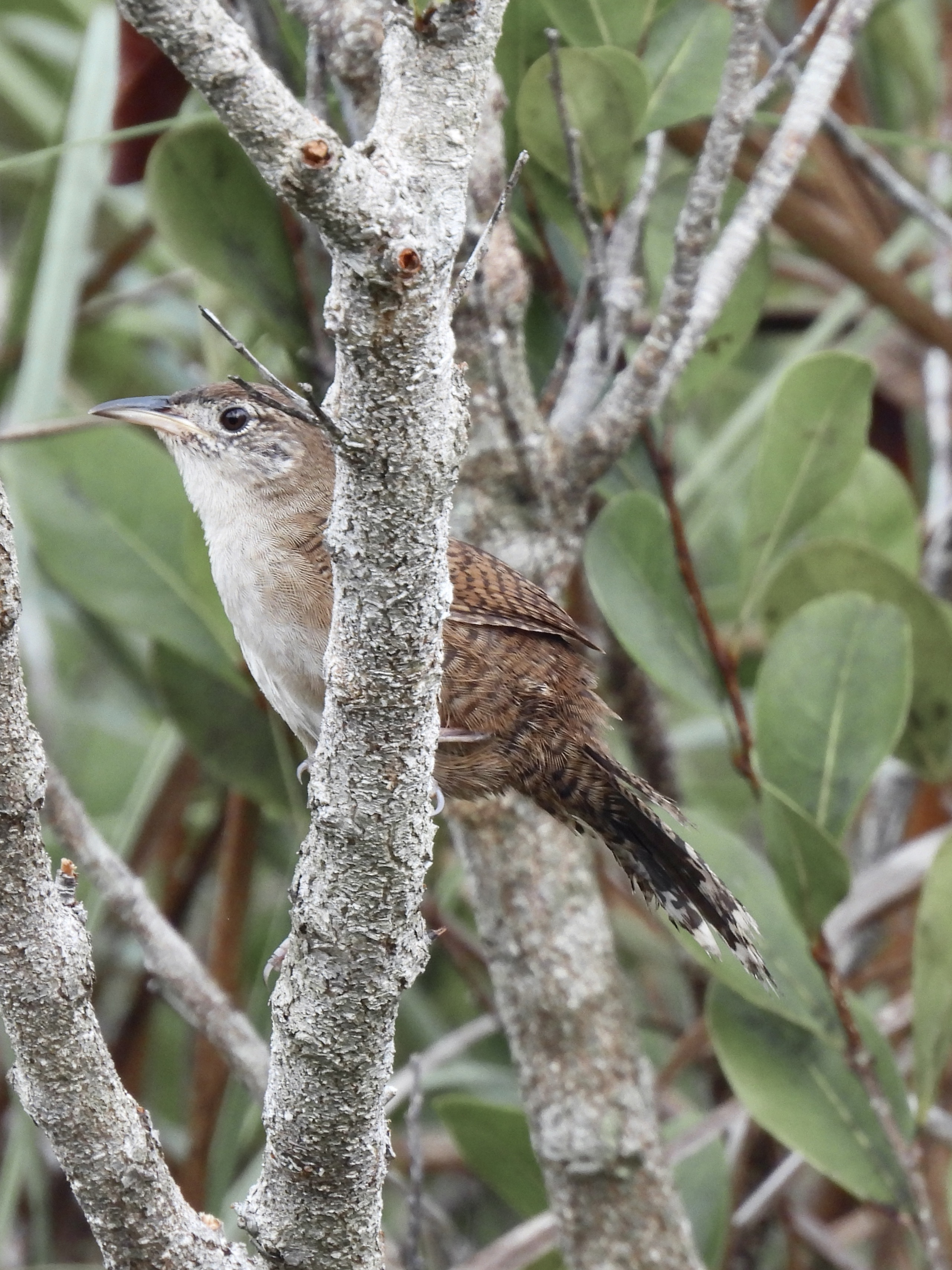
Zapata wren, 2025

== Habitat and conservation ==
The Zapata wren is confined and endemic to the Zapata Peninsula of southern Cuba. The Zapata wren's habitat is typically freshwater marsh and lowland savanna with scattered bushes and low trees. It feeds on insects, spiders, small snails, lizards and berries. The wren typically makes its nest in sawgrass tussocks. It is thought to breed between January and July.

Typical threats are fires in the dry season, drainage of the wetlands, destruction due to agriculture, and predation by introduced mongooses and rats.

== Discovery ==
The Zapata wren was formally described by American herpetologist Thomas Barbour, who gave it the specific name cerverai in honour of the wren's discoverer, Fermín Zanón Cervera, a Spaniard who had stayed on after the Spanish–American War and become a professional naturalist. Barbour had been accompanied by Cervera on his previous visits to Cuba, and on hearing of the strange birds to be found in the Zapata area, he sent the Spaniard on a series of trips into the region, eventually leading to the finding of the wren. In Spanish, the wren is known simply as ferminia.
