= Zapatista =

Zapatista(s) may refer to:

- Liberation Army of the South, a guerrilla force led by Emiliano Zapata in the Mexican Revolution 1911–1920
  - Zapatismo, the armed movement identified with the ideas of Emiliano Zapata
- Zapatista Army of National Liberation, a group that controls territory in Chiapas, Mexico
  - Neozapatismo, the political philosophy and practice of the Zapatista Army of National Liberation
  - Zapatista territories in Chiapas

== See also ==
- Emiliano Zapata (1879–1919), Mexican revolutionary
