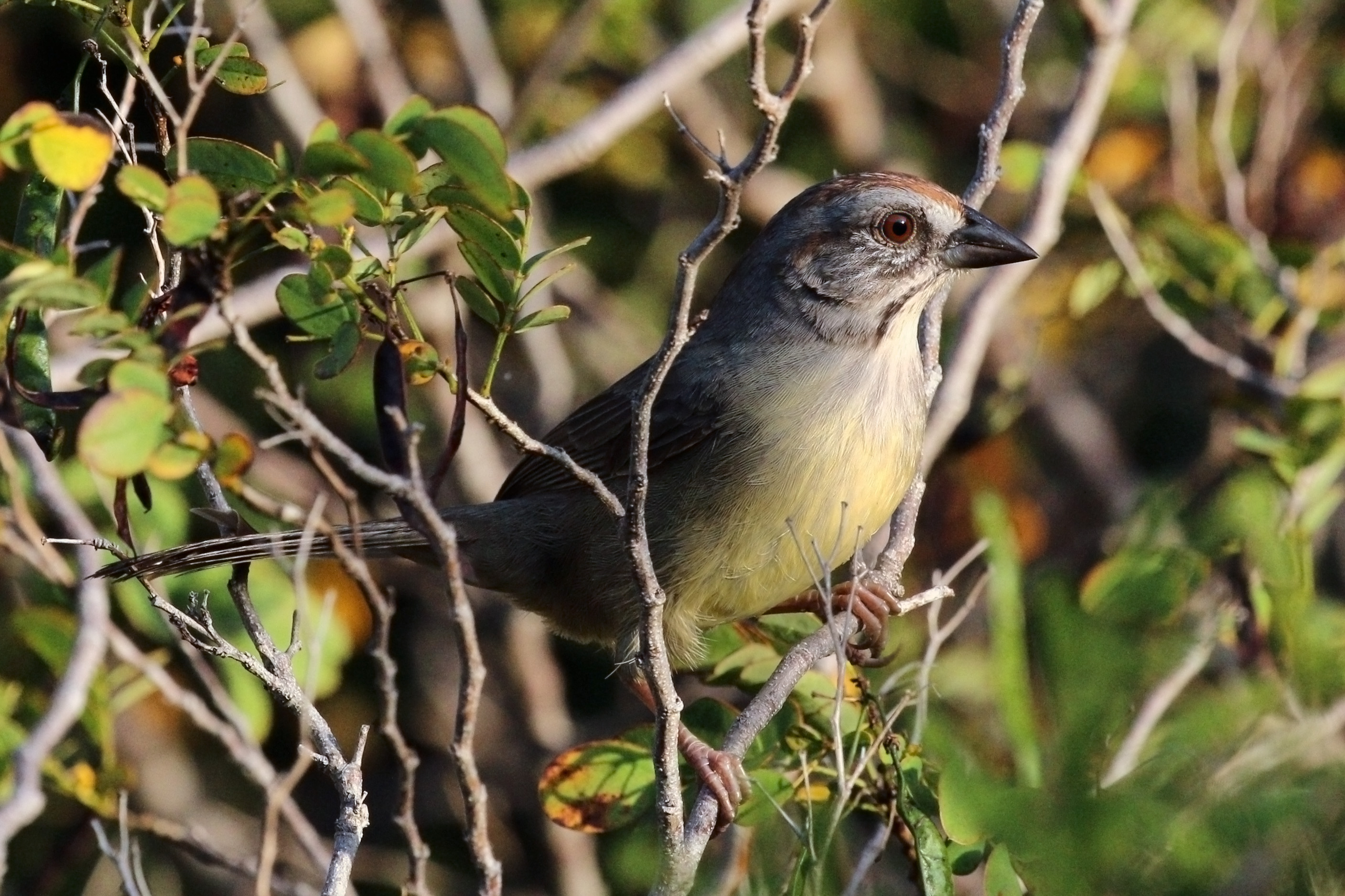
- T. i. varonai Cayo Romano, Cuba

Conservation status
- Near Threatened (IUCN 3.1)

Scientific classification
- Kingdom: Animalia
- Phylum: Chordata
- Class: Aves
- Order: Passeriformes
- Family: Passerellidae
- Genus: Torreornis; Barbour & Peters, 1927
- Species: T. inexpectata

Binomial name
- Torreornis inexpectata Barbour & Peters, 1927

Subspecies
- T. i. inexpectata; T. i. sigmani; T. i. varonai

= Zapata sparrow =

Species of bird

The Zapata sparrow (Torreornis inexpectata) is a medium-sized grey and yellow bird that lives in the grasslands of the Zapata Swamp and elsewhere on the island of Cuba. Measuring about 16.5 centimetres (6.5 in) in length, it is grey and yellow overall with a dark reddish-brown crown and olive-grey upperparts.

== Distribution and habitat ==
The Zapata sparrow is endemic to Cuba.

== History ==
It was discovered by Spanish zoologist, Fermín Zanón Cervera in March 1927 around Santo Tomás in the Zapata Swamp and formally described by American herpetologist Thomas Barbour and his compatriot, ornithologist James Lee Peters in 1927.

Barbour had been accompanied by Cervera on his previous visits to Cuba, and on hearing of the strange birds to be found in the Zapata area, he sent the Spaniard on a series of trips into the region, eventually leading to the finding of the sparrow. Two other populations have since been discovered, on the island of Cayo Coco in Camagüey Province and in a coastal region in Guantánamo Province. As the species is no longer confined to Zapata the alternative name of Cuban sparrow is sometimes suggested.

== Taxonomy ==
Each population is assigned to a different race due to differences in plumage and ecology. The nominate race T. i. inexpectana at Zapata is found in extensive sawgrass savannahs, the similarly-plumaged Cayo Coco race T. i. varonai is found in forests and shrubbery and the duller eastern race T. i. sigmani frequents arid areas of thorn-scrub and cacti.

=== The description of the subspecies varonai ===
The form varonai was described by in a Cuban publication, and further review is needed to determine its validity. Claims have been put forth relating to the obscurity or presumed non-existence of this original description. Buden and Olson (Smithsonian Contributions to Zoology, 477 (1989)), not reviewing the description, drew attention to Bond, who cited varonai to a different Cuban publication.

"Olson received a reprint of this from Regalado. The only indication of the source on this is printed at the top of page 87: 'Centre [sic] Agricola, No. 2 mayo-agosto/1981.' This is the citation given by Garrido et al. [serial Poeyana] (1986), whereas Bond [Ibid] (1982:12) cites the original description of Torreornis inexpectata varonai Regalado as 'Rev. Minist Educ. Sup. Rep. Cuba, 8, Nov. 2, 1981, pp. 87–106.,' that, apart from the initial page number being the same, would seem to be a different publication."

However, they failed to mention or cite Morton and Gonzalez Alonso (Wilson Bulletin, 1982, vol. 94/4), who make reference to varonai and where Centro Agricola is cited. Dickinson (Howard and Moore Complete Checklist, (2003)) also suggested that there was "an element of doubt" as to whether or not the description was published. However, copies of the serial dating to 1981 and earlier are currently deposited in the Smathers Library of the University of Florida.

== Call ==
The bird's song is described as "metallic high-pitched trill at intervals tziii-tzziii-tzziii ... and quiet tic-tic-tic".

== Diet ==
In the dry seasons the Zapata population feeds on seeds and flowers primarily, as well as, insects, spiders, snails and their eggs. In the wet season the Zapata sparrow is known to eat small lizards. It is thought to breed between March and June.

== Conservation ==
Typical threats are wildfires in the dry season, drainage of wetlands, and destruction of habitat due to agriculture and tourism.
