= Zapata Swamp =

Swamp located in Cuba

Ciénaga de Zapata
- IUCN category II (national park)
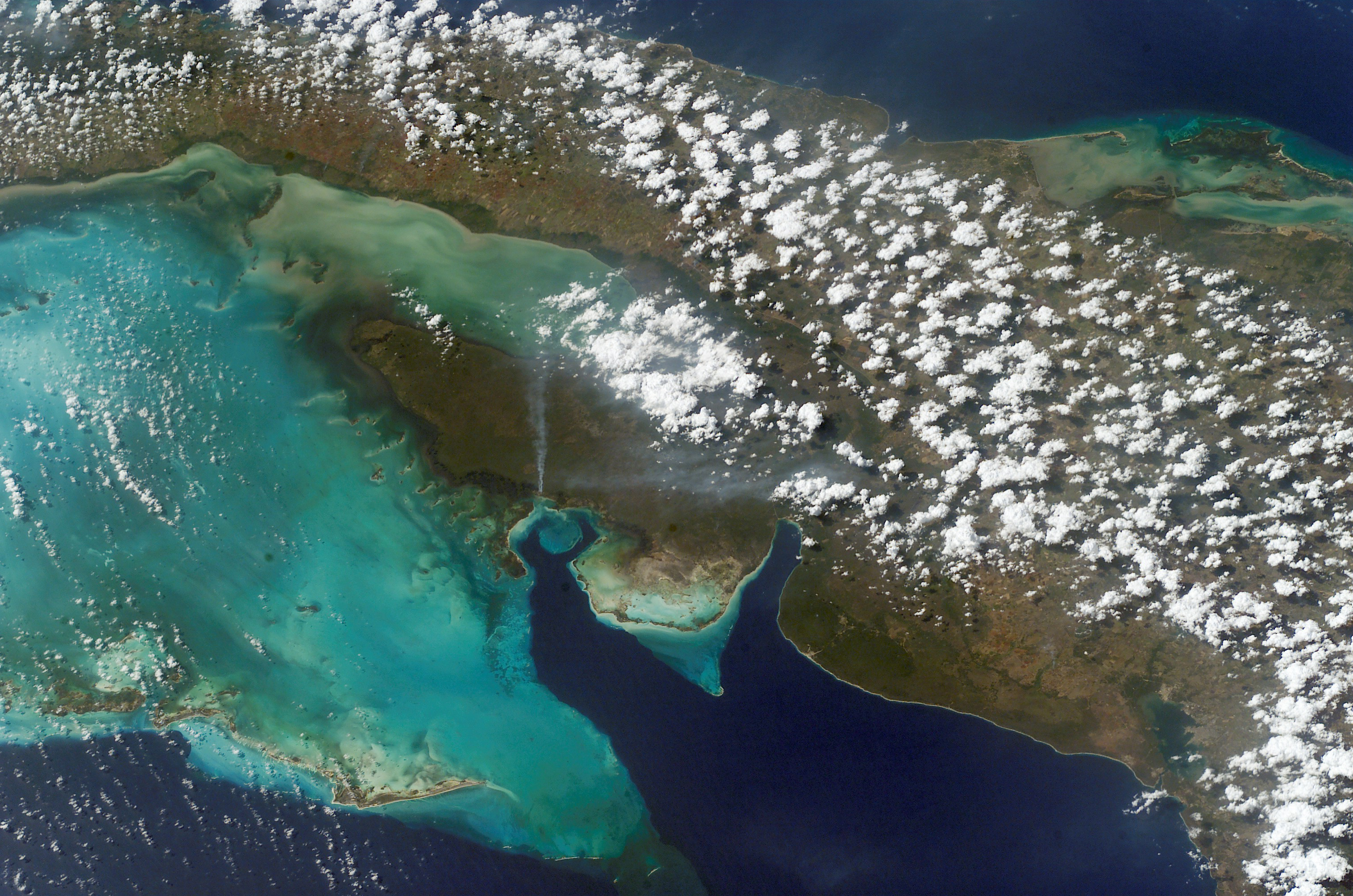
- Zapata Swamp as seen from space.

- Location within Cuba
- Location: Cuba
- Nearest city: Playa Larga; Jagüey Grande
- Coordinates: 22°24′N 81°34′W
- Area: 4,354.3 km^{2} (1,681.2 sq mi)

Ramsar Wetland
- Official name: Ciénaga de Zapata
- Designated: 12 April 2001
- Reference no.: 1062

The Zapata Swamp (Spanish: Ciénaga de Zapata, Spanish pronunciation: [ˈsjenaɣa ðe saˈpata]) is a swamp area located on the Zapata Peninsula in the southern Matanzas Province of Cuba, in the municipality of Ciénaga de Zapata. It is located less than 150 kilometres (93 mi) southeast of Havana.

== Species and preservation ==
Within the Zapata Swamp are over 900 autochthonous plant species, 175 species of birds, 31 species of reptiles, and over 1,000 species of invertebrates. Some of the most notable are local endemics to Cuba; for birds, it includes the Zapata wren, Zapata rail, and the Zapata sparrow. The Zapata Swamp is also a particular habitat of the bee hummingbird, the smallest bird species on the planet. The Zapata Swamp is also visited by 65 species of birds during their migration pattern from North America through the Caribbean to South America. Zapata is also known for the local endemic Cuban crocodile (Crocodylus rhombifer) which are restricted to the Zapata Swamp and are being reintroduced to the nearby Lanier Swamp on the Isle of Youth (Spanish: Isla de la Juventud). The sympatric American crocodile (Crocodylus acutus) also occurs within the Zapata Swamp, and hybridisation between the two species takes place, confirmed by the existence of a Cuban-American hybrid which was found on the Yucatán Peninsula in Mexico after migrating from the swamp.

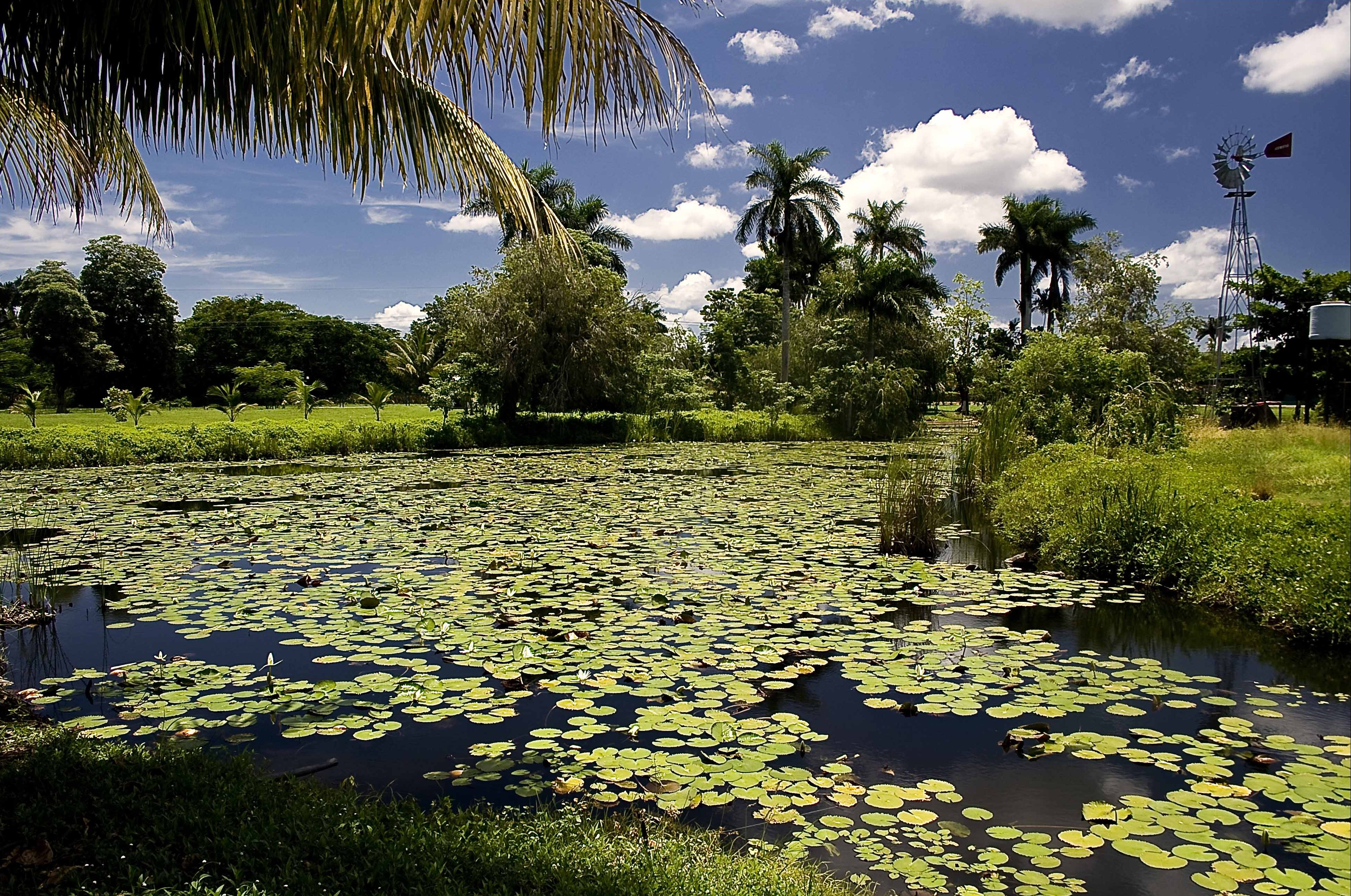
The swamp has a dense habitat

Within the Zapata Swamp are numerous areas designated for environmental preservation, such as Zapata Swamp Natural Reserve and Las Salinas wildlife sanctuary, which is part of the larger Ciénaga de Zapata Biosphere Reserve (IUCN category VI) which in total is over 6,000 km^{2} and the largest protected area, not only in Cuba, but also the Caribbean. The swamp is not only known for its size but also for being the best preserved wetlands in all of the Antilles, designated as a "Wetland of International Importance" by the Ramsar Convention on Wetlands in 1971. In mid-2001, an additional 4,520 km^{2} were declared a Ramsar Site.

== Geography ==
The Zapata Swamp lies between 22°01’ and 22°40’ N latitude and between 80°33’ and 82°09’ W longitude. The swamp in total is over one million acres (4,000 km^{2}). Topographically, the maximum height above sea level is only about 10 meters with the top depth in below-sea-level coastal zones as follows: 2 meters in the saltmarsh area and from 1–600 meters in the sea coastal zone. Between May and October, the warmest season of the year, average temperature is 30 °C (86 °F). Between November and April, the coldest season of the year, the temperature on average is 20 °C (68 °F).

== Gallery ==
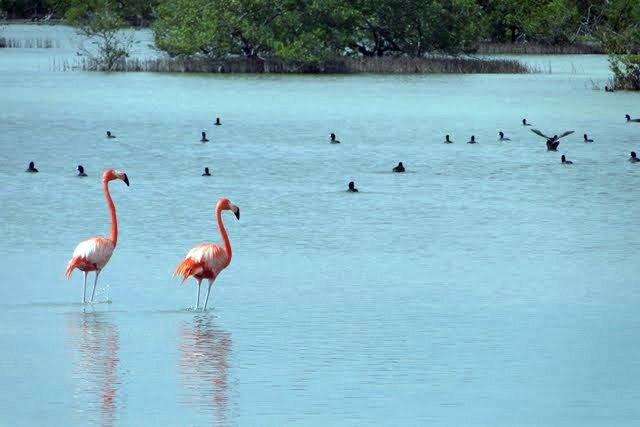
American flamingos in Zapata

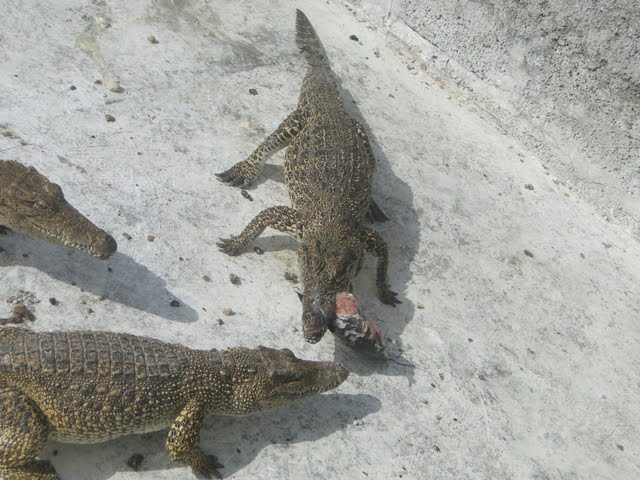
Crocodile farm in Zapata

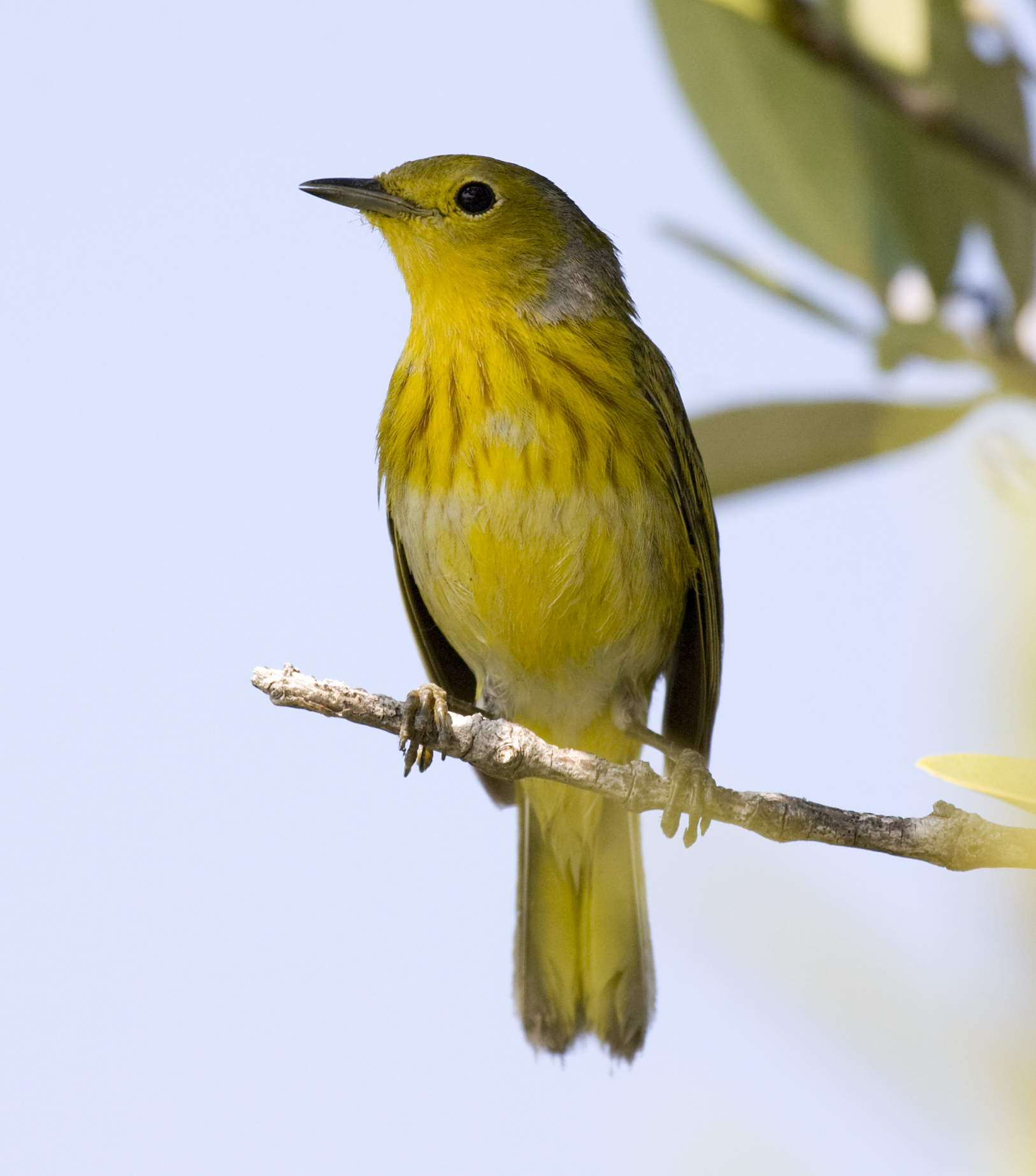
A Yellow Warbler in Zapata

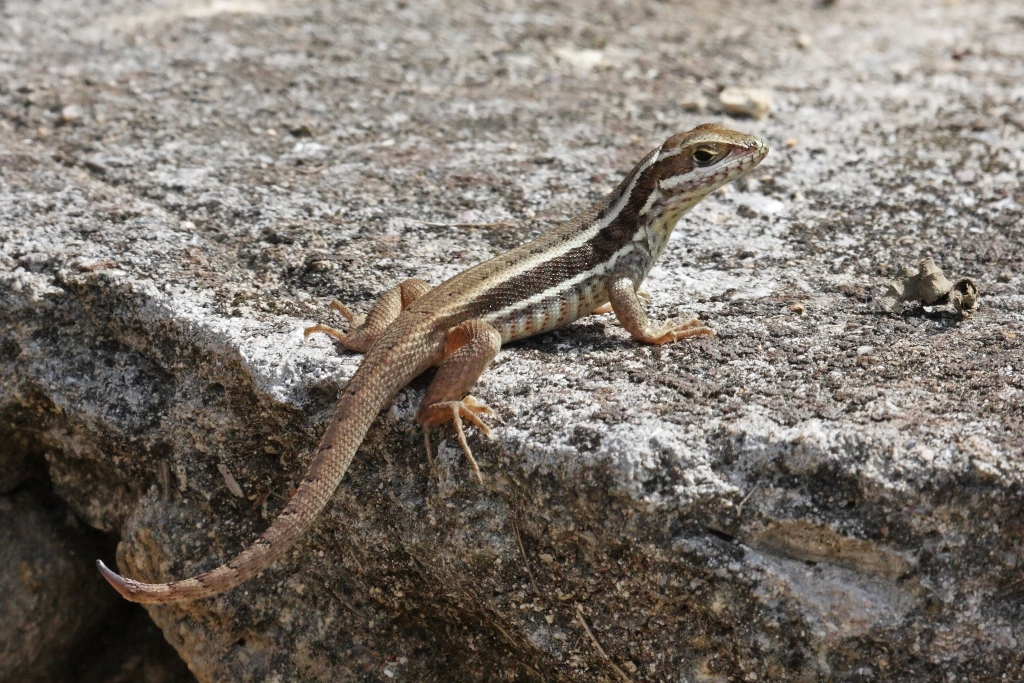
Cuban Brown Curlytail in Zapata

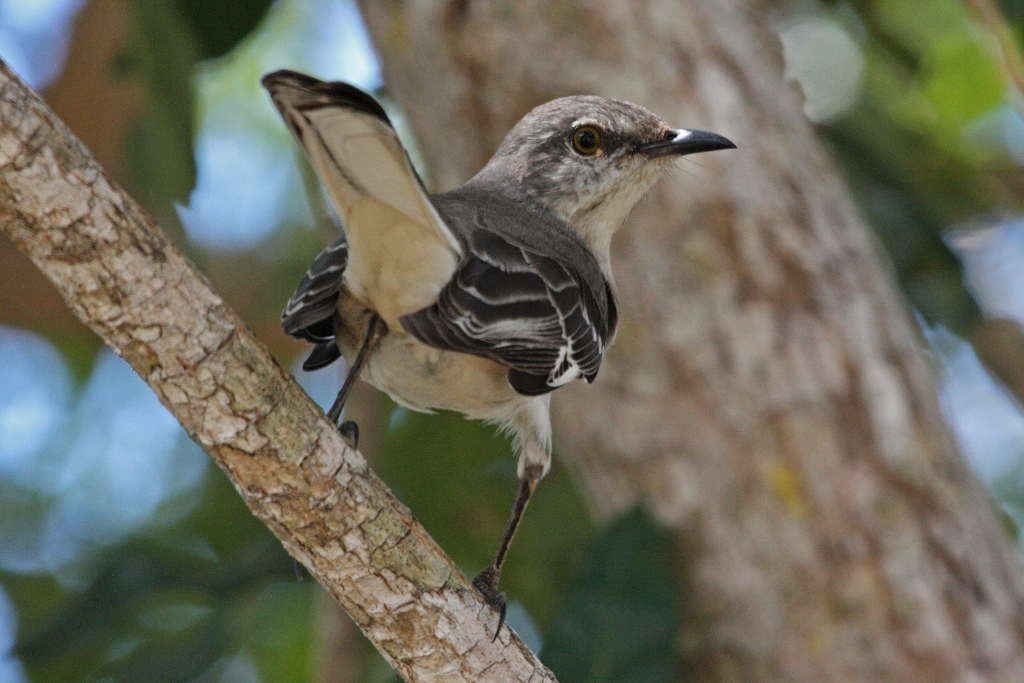
Northern Mockingbird in Zapata

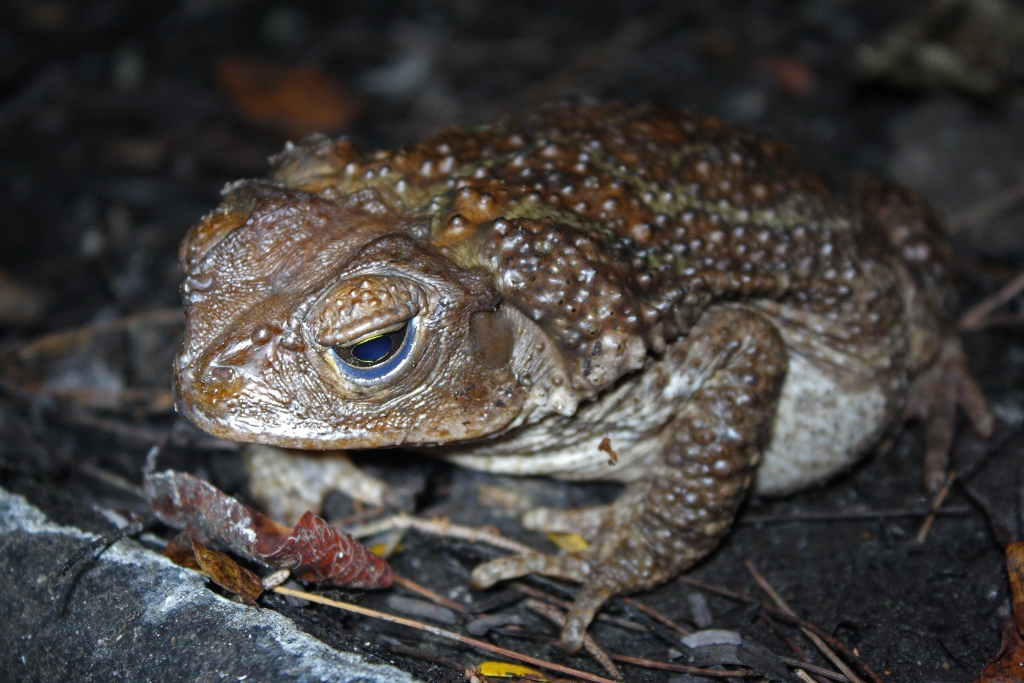
Eastern Giant Toad

== See also ==
- Ernst Thälmann Island
- Geography of Cuba
- Protected area
- Ramsar Convention
- World Conservation Monitoring Centre
- Zapata wren
