= Zapata Peninsula =

Matanzas Province, Cuba

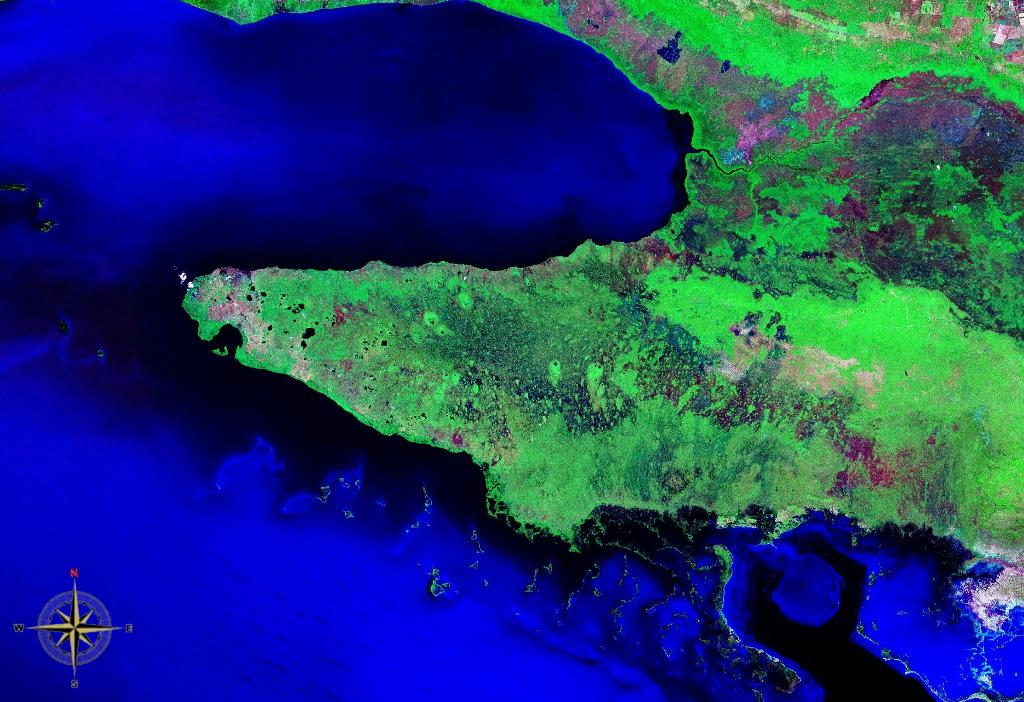
Zapata Peninsula seen from space (false color)

Zapata Peninsula (Spanish: Península de Zapata) is a large peninsula in Matanzas Province, southern Cuba, at 22.30°N 81.38°W. Ciénaga de Zapata National Park is located on the peninsula.

It is located south of Ensenada de la Broa, east of the gulf of Batabano, and north of the Gulf of Cazones. The Bay of Pigs defines its eastern limit. To the north, it is bounded by the Carretera Central highway.
